

498001–498100 

|-bgcolor=#E9E9E9
| 498001 ||  || — || March 9, 2007 || Kitt Peak || Spacewatch ||  || align=right | 1.9 km || 
|-id=002 bgcolor=#E9E9E9
| 498002 ||  || — || March 10, 2007 || Kitt Peak || Spacewatch ||  || align=right | 1.2 km || 
|-id=003 bgcolor=#E9E9E9
| 498003 ||  || — || March 12, 2007 || Mount Lemmon || Mount Lemmon Survey ||  || align=right data-sort-value="0.76" | 760 m || 
|-id=004 bgcolor=#E9E9E9
| 498004 ||  || — || March 12, 2007 || Mount Lemmon || Mount Lemmon Survey ||  || align=right | 1.2 km || 
|-id=005 bgcolor=#E9E9E9
| 498005 ||  || — || March 11, 2007 || Kitt Peak || Spacewatch ||  || align=right | 1.9 km || 
|-id=006 bgcolor=#E9E9E9
| 498006 ||  || — || January 28, 2007 || Mount Lemmon || Mount Lemmon Survey || EUN || align=right data-sort-value="0.99" | 990 m || 
|-id=007 bgcolor=#E9E9E9
| 498007 ||  || — || March 12, 2007 || Mount Lemmon || Mount Lemmon Survey ||  || align=right data-sort-value="0.70" | 700 m || 
|-id=008 bgcolor=#E9E9E9
| 498008 ||  || — || March 13, 2007 || Mount Lemmon || Mount Lemmon Survey ||  || align=right | 1.7 km || 
|-id=009 bgcolor=#E9E9E9
| 498009 ||  || — || January 28, 2007 || Mount Lemmon || Mount Lemmon Survey ||  || align=right data-sort-value="0.79" | 790 m || 
|-id=010 bgcolor=#E9E9E9
| 498010 ||  || — || January 28, 2007 || Mount Lemmon || Mount Lemmon Survey ||  || align=right | 2.1 km || 
|-id=011 bgcolor=#E9E9E9
| 498011 ||  || — || February 22, 2007 || Kitt Peak || Spacewatch ||  || align=right | 2.0 km || 
|-id=012 bgcolor=#E9E9E9
| 498012 ||  || — || March 12, 2007 || Kitt Peak || Spacewatch ||  || align=right | 1.3 km || 
|-id=013 bgcolor=#E9E9E9
| 498013 ||  || — || February 26, 2007 || Mount Lemmon || Mount Lemmon Survey ||  || align=right | 2.2 km || 
|-id=014 bgcolor=#E9E9E9
| 498014 ||  || — || February 26, 2007 || Mount Lemmon || Mount Lemmon Survey || HNS || align=right | 1.1 km || 
|-id=015 bgcolor=#E9E9E9
| 498015 ||  || — || March 14, 2007 || Kitt Peak || Spacewatch ||  || align=right data-sort-value="0.79" | 790 m || 
|-id=016 bgcolor=#E9E9E9
| 498016 ||  || — || March 15, 2007 || Kitt Peak || Spacewatch || HNS || align=right | 1.0 km || 
|-id=017 bgcolor=#E9E9E9
| 498017 ||  || — || March 10, 2007 || Kitt Peak || Spacewatch || HNS || align=right | 1.0 km || 
|-id=018 bgcolor=#E9E9E9
| 498018 ||  || — || February 17, 2007 || Kitt Peak || Spacewatch || ADE || align=right | 1.4 km || 
|-id=019 bgcolor=#E9E9E9
| 498019 ||  || — || February 26, 2007 || Mount Lemmon || Mount Lemmon Survey ||  || align=right | 1.2 km || 
|-id=020 bgcolor=#E9E9E9
| 498020 ||  || — || March 9, 2007 || Mount Lemmon || Mount Lemmon Survey ||  || align=right | 1.1 km || 
|-id=021 bgcolor=#E9E9E9
| 498021 ||  || — || March 10, 2007 || Mount Lemmon || Mount Lemmon Survey ||  || align=right | 1.4 km || 
|-id=022 bgcolor=#E9E9E9
| 498022 ||  || — || February 21, 2007 || Mount Lemmon || Mount Lemmon Survey ||  || align=right | 1.3 km || 
|-id=023 bgcolor=#E9E9E9
| 498023 ||  || — || February 22, 2007 || Siding Spring || SSS ||  || align=right | 1.2 km || 
|-id=024 bgcolor=#E9E9E9
| 498024 ||  || — || April 11, 2007 || Catalina || CSS ||  || align=right | 1.7 km || 
|-id=025 bgcolor=#E9E9E9
| 498025 ||  || — || March 9, 2007 || Kitt Peak || Spacewatch ||  || align=right | 1.4 km || 
|-id=026 bgcolor=#E9E9E9
| 498026 ||  || — || April 7, 2007 || Mount Lemmon || Mount Lemmon Survey ||  || align=right | 1.7 km || 
|-id=027 bgcolor=#E9E9E9
| 498027 ||  || — || April 11, 2007 || Kitt Peak || Spacewatch ||  || align=right | 1.5 km || 
|-id=028 bgcolor=#E9E9E9
| 498028 ||  || — || April 14, 2007 || Mount Lemmon || Mount Lemmon Survey ||  || align=right | 1.7 km || 
|-id=029 bgcolor=#E9E9E9
| 498029 ||  || — || March 9, 2007 || Mount Lemmon || Mount Lemmon Survey || EUN || align=right | 2.0 km || 
|-id=030 bgcolor=#E9E9E9
| 498030 ||  || — || April 14, 2007 || Kitt Peak || Spacewatch ||  || align=right | 1.8 km || 
|-id=031 bgcolor=#E9E9E9
| 498031 ||  || — || April 15, 2007 || Kitt Peak || Spacewatch ||  || align=right | 1.4 km || 
|-id=032 bgcolor=#E9E9E9
| 498032 ||  || — || March 14, 2007 || Mount Lemmon || Mount Lemmon Survey || BAR || align=right data-sort-value="0.83" | 830 m || 
|-id=033 bgcolor=#E9E9E9
| 498033 ||  || — || April 18, 2007 || Kitt Peak || Spacewatch ||  || align=right | 1.6 km || 
|-id=034 bgcolor=#E9E9E9
| 498034 ||  || — || April 19, 2007 || Kitt Peak || Spacewatch ||  || align=right | 1.7 km || 
|-id=035 bgcolor=#E9E9E9
| 498035 ||  || — || April 20, 2007 || Kitt Peak || Spacewatch ||  || align=right | 2.6 km || 
|-id=036 bgcolor=#E9E9E9
| 498036 ||  || — || March 13, 2007 || Mount Lemmon || Mount Lemmon Survey || AEO || align=right | 1.6 km || 
|-id=037 bgcolor=#E9E9E9
| 498037 ||  || — || March 13, 2007 || Kitt Peak || Spacewatch ||  || align=right | 1.3 km || 
|-id=038 bgcolor=#E9E9E9
| 498038 ||  || — || April 23, 2007 || Kitt Peak || Spacewatch ||  || align=right | 2.0 km || 
|-id=039 bgcolor=#E9E9E9
| 498039 ||  || — || April 19, 2007 || Mount Lemmon || Mount Lemmon Survey ||  || align=right | 2.1 km || 
|-id=040 bgcolor=#E9E9E9
| 498040 ||  || — || April 19, 2007 || Kitt Peak || Spacewatch ||  || align=right | 1.7 km || 
|-id=041 bgcolor=#E9E9E9
| 498041 ||  || — || April 22, 2007 || Kitt Peak || Spacewatch || HNA || align=right | 1.5 km || 
|-id=042 bgcolor=#FA8072
| 498042 ||  || — || May 12, 2007 || Kitt Peak || Spacewatch || H || align=right data-sort-value="0.61" | 610 m || 
|-id=043 bgcolor=#E9E9E9
| 498043 ||  || — || June 10, 2007 || Kitt Peak || Spacewatch ||  || align=right | 1.4 km || 
|-id=044 bgcolor=#E9E9E9
| 498044 ||  || — || June 9, 2007 || Kitt Peak || Spacewatch ||  || align=right | 2.0 km || 
|-id=045 bgcolor=#fefefe
| 498045 ||  || — || July 18, 2007 || Mount Lemmon || Mount Lemmon Survey ||  || align=right data-sort-value="0.56" | 560 m || 
|-id=046 bgcolor=#FA8072
| 498046 ||  || — || August 12, 2007 || San Marcello || Pistoia Mountains Obs. ||  || align=right data-sort-value="0.71" | 710 m || 
|-id=047 bgcolor=#FA8072
| 498047 ||  || — || August 13, 2007 || Anderson Mesa || LONEOS ||  || align=right data-sort-value="0.63" | 630 m || 
|-id=048 bgcolor=#fefefe
| 498048 ||  || — || August 23, 2007 || Kitt Peak || Spacewatch ||  || align=right data-sort-value="0.54" | 540 m || 
|-id=049 bgcolor=#fefefe
| 498049 ||  || — || September 9, 2007 || Kitt Peak || Spacewatch ||  || align=right data-sort-value="0.58" | 580 m || 
|-id=050 bgcolor=#d6d6d6
| 498050 ||  || — || September 9, 2007 || Kitt Peak || Spacewatch || EOS || align=right | 1.6 km || 
|-id=051 bgcolor=#d6d6d6
| 498051 ||  || — || September 9, 2007 || Kitt Peak || Spacewatch || EOS || align=right | 2.0 km || 
|-id=052 bgcolor=#d6d6d6
| 498052 ||  || — || September 9, 2007 || Kitt Peak || Spacewatch ||  || align=right | 1.9 km || 
|-id=053 bgcolor=#d6d6d6
| 498053 ||  || — || April 2, 2005 || Mount Lemmon || Mount Lemmon Survey || EOS || align=right | 2.5 km || 
|-id=054 bgcolor=#d6d6d6
| 498054 ||  || — || September 9, 2007 || Mount Lemmon || Mount Lemmon Survey || 628 || align=right | 2.0 km || 
|-id=055 bgcolor=#fefefe
| 498055 ||  || — || September 9, 2007 || Kitt Peak || Spacewatch ||  || align=right data-sort-value="0.71" | 710 m || 
|-id=056 bgcolor=#d6d6d6
| 498056 ||  || — || September 9, 2007 || Kitt Peak || Spacewatch ||  || align=right | 3.2 km || 
|-id=057 bgcolor=#fefefe
| 498057 ||  || — || September 9, 2007 || Mount Lemmon || Mount Lemmon Survey || (1338) || align=right data-sort-value="0.65" | 650 m || 
|-id=058 bgcolor=#d6d6d6
| 498058 ||  || — || September 10, 2007 || Mount Lemmon || Mount Lemmon Survey ||  || align=right | 1.8 km || 
|-id=059 bgcolor=#fefefe
| 498059 ||  || — || September 10, 2007 || Kitt Peak || Spacewatch ||  || align=right data-sort-value="0.61" | 610 m || 
|-id=060 bgcolor=#fefefe
| 498060 ||  || — || September 10, 2007 || Kitt Peak || Spacewatch ||  || align=right data-sort-value="0.53" | 530 m || 
|-id=061 bgcolor=#d6d6d6
| 498061 ||  || — || April 2, 2005 || Mount Lemmon || Mount Lemmon Survey || EMA || align=right | 2.9 km || 
|-id=062 bgcolor=#fefefe
| 498062 ||  || — || August 21, 2007 || Anderson Mesa || LONEOS ||  || align=right data-sort-value="0.70" | 700 m || 
|-id=063 bgcolor=#fefefe
| 498063 ||  || — || September 11, 2007 || Kitt Peak || Spacewatch ||  || align=right data-sort-value="0.60" | 600 m || 
|-id=064 bgcolor=#fefefe
| 498064 ||  || — || September 11, 2007 || Kitt Peak || Spacewatch ||  || align=right data-sort-value="0.72" | 720 m || 
|-id=065 bgcolor=#fefefe
| 498065 ||  || — || September 10, 2007 || Kitt Peak || Spacewatch ||  || align=right data-sort-value="0.68" | 680 m || 
|-id=066 bgcolor=#FFC2E0
| 498066 ||  || — || September 14, 2007 || Catalina || CSS || AMO || align=right data-sort-value="0.59" | 590 m || 
|-id=067 bgcolor=#fefefe
| 498067 ||  || — || September 11, 2007 || Purple Mountain || PMO NEO ||  || align=right data-sort-value="0.71" | 710 m || 
|-id=068 bgcolor=#FFC2E0
| 498068 ||  || — || September 15, 2007 || Mount Lemmon || Mount Lemmon Survey || APO || align=right data-sort-value="0.60" | 600 m || 
|-id=069 bgcolor=#fefefe
| 498069 ||  || — || September 10, 2007 || Kitt Peak || Spacewatch ||  || align=right data-sort-value="0.54" | 540 m || 
|-id=070 bgcolor=#d6d6d6
| 498070 ||  || — || September 12, 2007 || Mount Lemmon || Mount Lemmon Survey ||  || align=right | 2.3 km || 
|-id=071 bgcolor=#d6d6d6
| 498071 ||  || — || September 12, 2007 || Mount Lemmon || Mount Lemmon Survey ||  || align=right | 2.1 km || 
|-id=072 bgcolor=#d6d6d6
| 498072 ||  || — || September 10, 2007 || Kitt Peak || Spacewatch || EOS || align=right | 1.8 km || 
|-id=073 bgcolor=#fefefe
| 498073 ||  || — || September 10, 2007 || Kitt Peak || Spacewatch ||  || align=right data-sort-value="0.60" | 600 m || 
|-id=074 bgcolor=#fefefe
| 498074 ||  || — || August 22, 2007 || Socorro || LINEAR ||  || align=right data-sort-value="0.78" | 780 m || 
|-id=075 bgcolor=#d6d6d6
| 498075 ||  || — || September 10, 2007 || Kitt Peak || Spacewatch ||  || align=right | 2.8 km || 
|-id=076 bgcolor=#d6d6d6
| 498076 ||  || — || September 11, 2007 || Mount Lemmon || Mount Lemmon Survey ||  || align=right | 2.2 km || 
|-id=077 bgcolor=#fefefe
| 498077 ||  || — || September 10, 2007 || Kitt Peak || Spacewatch ||  || align=right data-sort-value="0.51" | 510 m || 
|-id=078 bgcolor=#fefefe
| 498078 ||  || — || September 12, 2007 || Kitt Peak || Spacewatch ||  || align=right data-sort-value="0.62" | 620 m || 
|-id=079 bgcolor=#d6d6d6
| 498079 ||  || — || September 13, 2007 || Kitt Peak || Spacewatch ||  || align=right | 2.0 km || 
|-id=080 bgcolor=#d6d6d6
| 498080 ||  || — || September 10, 2007 || Kitt Peak || Spacewatch || KOR || align=right | 1.3 km || 
|-id=081 bgcolor=#fefefe
| 498081 ||  || — || September 10, 2007 || Kitt Peak || Spacewatch ||  || align=right data-sort-value="0.51" | 510 m || 
|-id=082 bgcolor=#fefefe
| 498082 ||  || — || September 10, 2007 || Kitt Peak || Spacewatch ||  || align=right data-sort-value="0.53" | 530 m || 
|-id=083 bgcolor=#d6d6d6
| 498083 ||  || — || September 12, 2007 || Mount Lemmon || Mount Lemmon Survey ||  || align=right | 2.3 km || 
|-id=084 bgcolor=#d6d6d6
| 498084 ||  || — || September 12, 2007 || Kitt Peak || Spacewatch ||  || align=right | 1.7 km || 
|-id=085 bgcolor=#fefefe
| 498085 ||  || — || September 14, 2007 || Mount Lemmon || Mount Lemmon Survey ||  || align=right data-sort-value="0.66" | 660 m || 
|-id=086 bgcolor=#d6d6d6
| 498086 ||  || — || September 10, 2007 || Kitt Peak || Spacewatch ||  || align=right | 2.2 km || 
|-id=087 bgcolor=#fefefe
| 498087 ||  || — || September 10, 2007 || Kitt Peak || Spacewatch ||  || align=right data-sort-value="0.58" | 580 m || 
|-id=088 bgcolor=#d6d6d6
| 498088 ||  || — || September 10, 2007 || Kitt Peak || Spacewatch ||  || align=right | 1.7 km || 
|-id=089 bgcolor=#d6d6d6
| 498089 ||  || — || September 10, 2007 || Kitt Peak || Spacewatch ||  || align=right | 2.3 km || 
|-id=090 bgcolor=#fefefe
| 498090 ||  || — || September 11, 2007 || Kitt Peak || Spacewatch ||  || align=right data-sort-value="0.72" | 720 m || 
|-id=091 bgcolor=#fefefe
| 498091 ||  || — || September 14, 2007 || Catalina || CSS ||  || align=right data-sort-value="0.72" | 720 m || 
|-id=092 bgcolor=#fefefe
| 498092 ||  || — || September 14, 2007 || Mount Lemmon || Mount Lemmon Survey || H || align=right data-sort-value="0.59" | 590 m || 
|-id=093 bgcolor=#d6d6d6
| 498093 ||  || — || September 10, 2007 || Kitt Peak || Spacewatch || EOS || align=right | 1.7 km || 
|-id=094 bgcolor=#fefefe
| 498094 ||  || — || July 18, 2007 || Mount Lemmon || Mount Lemmon Survey ||  || align=right data-sort-value="0.52" | 520 m || 
|-id=095 bgcolor=#d6d6d6
| 498095 ||  || — || September 15, 2007 || Mount Lemmon || Mount Lemmon Survey ||  || align=right | 2.5 km || 
|-id=096 bgcolor=#d6d6d6
| 498096 ||  || — || September 15, 2007 || Kitt Peak || Spacewatch ||  || align=right | 1.9 km || 
|-id=097 bgcolor=#d6d6d6
| 498097 ||  || — || September 13, 2007 || Catalina || CSS ||  || align=right | 2.8 km || 
|-id=098 bgcolor=#d6d6d6
| 498098 ||  || — || September 12, 2007 || Mount Lemmon || Mount Lemmon Survey ||  || align=right | 1.7 km || 
|-id=099 bgcolor=#d6d6d6
| 498099 ||  || — || September 12, 2007 || Mount Lemmon || Mount Lemmon Survey || KOR  KAR || align=right | 1.2 km || 
|-id=100 bgcolor=#d6d6d6
| 498100 ||  || — || September 12, 2007 || Mount Lemmon || Mount Lemmon Survey ||  || align=right | 1.8 km || 
|}

498101–498200 

|-bgcolor=#d6d6d6
| 498101 ||  || — || September 12, 2007 || Mount Lemmon || Mount Lemmon Survey || THM || align=right | 2.2 km || 
|-id=102 bgcolor=#d6d6d6
| 498102 ||  || — || September 13, 2007 || Mount Lemmon || Mount Lemmon Survey ||  || align=right | 2.0 km || 
|-id=103 bgcolor=#d6d6d6
| 498103 ||  || — || September 14, 2007 || Mount Lemmon || Mount Lemmon Survey ||  || align=right | 2.1 km || 
|-id=104 bgcolor=#d6d6d6
| 498104 ||  || — || September 14, 2007 || Mount Lemmon || Mount Lemmon Survey ||  || align=right | 2.2 km || 
|-id=105 bgcolor=#d6d6d6
| 498105 ||  || — || September 10, 2007 || Mount Lemmon || Mount Lemmon Survey ||  || align=right | 3.4 km || 
|-id=106 bgcolor=#fefefe
| 498106 ||  || — || September 10, 2007 || Kitt Peak || Spacewatch ||  || align=right data-sort-value="0.62" | 620 m || 
|-id=107 bgcolor=#d6d6d6
| 498107 ||  || — || September 13, 2007 || Mount Lemmon || Mount Lemmon Survey ||  || align=right | 2.8 km || 
|-id=108 bgcolor=#fefefe
| 498108 ||  || — || May 26, 2006 || Kitt Peak || Spacewatch ||  || align=right data-sort-value="0.67" | 670 m || 
|-id=109 bgcolor=#fefefe
| 498109 ||  || — || September 10, 2007 || Catalina || CSS ||  || align=right data-sort-value="0.56" | 560 m || 
|-id=110 bgcolor=#d6d6d6
| 498110 ||  || — || September 13, 2007 || Mount Lemmon || Mount Lemmon Survey || EOS || align=right | 1.7 km || 
|-id=111 bgcolor=#d6d6d6
| 498111 ||  || — || September 9, 2007 || Mount Lemmon || Mount Lemmon Survey ||  || align=right | 2.5 km || 
|-id=112 bgcolor=#fefefe
| 498112 ||  || — || September 9, 2007 || Mount Lemmon || Mount Lemmon Survey ||  || align=right data-sort-value="0.59" | 590 m || 
|-id=113 bgcolor=#d6d6d6
| 498113 ||  || — || September 14, 2007 || Mount Lemmon || Mount Lemmon Survey ||  || align=right | 1.8 km || 
|-id=114 bgcolor=#d6d6d6
| 498114 ||  || — || September 15, 2007 || Mount Lemmon || Mount Lemmon Survey ||  || align=right | 2.4 km || 
|-id=115 bgcolor=#d6d6d6
| 498115 ||  || — || September 14, 2007 || Mount Lemmon || Mount Lemmon Survey ||  || align=right | 2.4 km || 
|-id=116 bgcolor=#fefefe
| 498116 ||  || — || September 8, 2007 || Anderson Mesa || LONEOS ||  || align=right data-sort-value="0.87" | 870 m || 
|-id=117 bgcolor=#d6d6d6
| 498117 ||  || — || September 16, 2007 || Socorro || LINEAR ||  || align=right | 3.1 km || 
|-id=118 bgcolor=#d6d6d6
| 498118 ||  || — || September 18, 2007 || Kitt Peak || Spacewatch ||  || align=right | 2.3 km || 
|-id=119 bgcolor=#fefefe
| 498119 ||  || — || September 10, 2007 || Kitt Peak || Spacewatch ||  || align=right data-sort-value="0.58" | 580 m || 
|-id=120 bgcolor=#fefefe
| 498120 ||  || — || September 19, 2007 || Kitt Peak || Spacewatch ||  || align=right data-sort-value="0.77" | 770 m || 
|-id=121 bgcolor=#d6d6d6
| 498121 ||  || — || September 30, 2007 || Kitt Peak || Spacewatch ||  || align=right | 1.8 km || 
|-id=122 bgcolor=#d6d6d6
| 498122 ||  || — || September 18, 2007 || Mount Lemmon || Mount Lemmon Survey ||  || align=right | 2.3 km || 
|-id=123 bgcolor=#fefefe
| 498123 ||  || — || September 25, 2007 || Mount Lemmon || Mount Lemmon Survey || (2076) || align=right data-sort-value="0.55" | 550 m || 
|-id=124 bgcolor=#d6d6d6
| 498124 ||  || — || October 6, 2007 || Dauban || Chante-Perdrix Obs. ||  || align=right | 2.9 km || 
|-id=125 bgcolor=#FFC2E0
| 498125 ||  || — || October 8, 2007 || Catalina || CSS || AMO || align=right data-sort-value="0.45" | 450 m || 
|-id=126 bgcolor=#fefefe
| 498126 ||  || — || September 13, 2007 || Mount Lemmon || Mount Lemmon Survey ||  || align=right data-sort-value="0.65" | 650 m || 
|-id=127 bgcolor=#d6d6d6
| 498127 ||  || — || October 4, 2007 || Mount Lemmon || Mount Lemmon Survey || LAU || align=right | 1.6 km || 
|-id=128 bgcolor=#fefefe
| 498128 ||  || — || October 4, 2007 || Kitt Peak || Spacewatch ||  || align=right data-sort-value="0.64" | 640 m || 
|-id=129 bgcolor=#d6d6d6
| 498129 ||  || — || September 14, 2007 || Mount Lemmon || Mount Lemmon Survey ||  || align=right | 2.4 km || 
|-id=130 bgcolor=#d6d6d6
| 498130 ||  || — || October 4, 2007 || Kitt Peak || Spacewatch || EOS || align=right | 1.9 km || 
|-id=131 bgcolor=#d6d6d6
| 498131 ||  || — || October 6, 2007 || Kitt Peak || Spacewatch ||  || align=right | 2.1 km || 
|-id=132 bgcolor=#d6d6d6
| 498132 ||  || — || October 6, 2007 || Kitt Peak || Spacewatch ||  || align=right | 2.4 km || 
|-id=133 bgcolor=#d6d6d6
| 498133 ||  || — || October 6, 2007 || Kitt Peak || Spacewatch ||  || align=right | 1.8 km || 
|-id=134 bgcolor=#d6d6d6
| 498134 ||  || — || October 6, 2007 || Kitt Peak || Spacewatch || EOS || align=right | 1.7 km || 
|-id=135 bgcolor=#d6d6d6
| 498135 ||  || — || April 2, 2005 || Mount Lemmon || Mount Lemmon Survey ||  || align=right | 2.2 km || 
|-id=136 bgcolor=#fefefe
| 498136 ||  || — || September 14, 2007 || Mount Lemmon || Mount Lemmon Survey ||  || align=right data-sort-value="0.59" | 590 m || 
|-id=137 bgcolor=#d6d6d6
| 498137 ||  || — || October 4, 2007 || Kitt Peak || Spacewatch || HYG || align=right | 2.2 km || 
|-id=138 bgcolor=#d6d6d6
| 498138 ||  || — || September 8, 2007 || Mount Lemmon || Mount Lemmon Survey ||  || align=right | 2.2 km || 
|-id=139 bgcolor=#d6d6d6
| 498139 ||  || — || October 4, 2007 || Kitt Peak || Spacewatch ||  || align=right | 1.9 km || 
|-id=140 bgcolor=#fefefe
| 498140 ||  || — || October 4, 2007 || Kitt Peak || Spacewatch ||  || align=right data-sort-value="0.68" | 680 m || 
|-id=141 bgcolor=#d6d6d6
| 498141 ||  || — || October 4, 2007 || Kitt Peak || Spacewatch ||  || align=right | 2.3 km || 
|-id=142 bgcolor=#d6d6d6
| 498142 ||  || — || October 7, 2007 || Mount Lemmon || Mount Lemmon Survey ||  || align=right | 2.1 km || 
|-id=143 bgcolor=#FFC2E0
| 498143 ||  || — || October 12, 2007 || Catalina || CSS || APO || align=right | 1.5 km || 
|-id=144 bgcolor=#FA8072
| 498144 ||  || — || September 15, 2007 || Catalina || CSS ||  || align=right data-sort-value="0.80" | 800 m || 
|-id=145 bgcolor=#d6d6d6
| 498145 ||  || — || October 7, 2007 || Mount Lemmon || Mount Lemmon Survey ||  || align=right | 2.4 km || 
|-id=146 bgcolor=#d6d6d6
| 498146 ||  || — || October 8, 2007 || Mount Lemmon || Mount Lemmon Survey ||  || align=right | 2.1 km || 
|-id=147 bgcolor=#d6d6d6
| 498147 ||  || — || September 9, 2007 || Mount Lemmon || Mount Lemmon Survey ||  || align=right | 1.8 km || 
|-id=148 bgcolor=#d6d6d6
| 498148 ||  || — || September 10, 2007 || Mount Lemmon || Mount Lemmon Survey ||  || align=right | 2.3 km || 
|-id=149 bgcolor=#d6d6d6
| 498149 ||  || — || October 8, 2007 || Mount Lemmon || Mount Lemmon Survey ||  || align=right | 2.2 km || 
|-id=150 bgcolor=#fefefe
| 498150 ||  || — || October 8, 2007 || Mount Lemmon || Mount Lemmon Survey ||  || align=right data-sort-value="0.57" | 570 m || 
|-id=151 bgcolor=#fefefe
| 498151 ||  || — || October 7, 2007 || Mount Lemmon || Mount Lemmon Survey ||  || align=right data-sort-value="0.63" | 630 m || 
|-id=152 bgcolor=#FA8072
| 498152 ||  || — || October 8, 2007 || Catalina || CSS ||  || align=right data-sort-value="0.81" | 810 m || 
|-id=153 bgcolor=#d6d6d6
| 498153 ||  || — || September 12, 2007 || Mount Lemmon || Mount Lemmon Survey || EOS || align=right | 1.5 km || 
|-id=154 bgcolor=#d6d6d6
| 498154 ||  || — || October 8, 2007 || Catalina || CSS || EOS || align=right | 1.8 km || 
|-id=155 bgcolor=#d6d6d6
| 498155 ||  || — || October 8, 2007 || Kitt Peak || Spacewatch || TEL || align=right | 1.3 km || 
|-id=156 bgcolor=#d6d6d6
| 498156 ||  || — || September 20, 2007 || Catalina || CSS ||  || align=right | 2.9 km || 
|-id=157 bgcolor=#d6d6d6
| 498157 ||  || — || October 6, 2007 || Kitt Peak || Spacewatch ||  || align=right | 2.4 km || 
|-id=158 bgcolor=#fefefe
| 498158 ||  || — || October 6, 2007 || Kitt Peak || Spacewatch ||  || align=right data-sort-value="0.73" | 730 m || 
|-id=159 bgcolor=#fefefe
| 498159 ||  || — || October 7, 2007 || Mount Lemmon || Mount Lemmon Survey ||  || align=right data-sort-value="0.45" | 450 m || 
|-id=160 bgcolor=#d6d6d6
| 498160 ||  || — || October 7, 2007 || Mount Lemmon || Mount Lemmon Survey ||  || align=right | 2.1 km || 
|-id=161 bgcolor=#d6d6d6
| 498161 ||  || — || October 8, 2007 || Kitt Peak || Spacewatch ||  || align=right | 2.2 km || 
|-id=162 bgcolor=#d6d6d6
| 498162 ||  || — || September 12, 2007 || Mount Lemmon || Mount Lemmon Survey || EOS || align=right | 1.5 km || 
|-id=163 bgcolor=#d6d6d6
| 498163 ||  || — || September 24, 2007 || Kitt Peak || Spacewatch ||  || align=right | 2.2 km || 
|-id=164 bgcolor=#fefefe
| 498164 ||  || — || October 11, 2007 || Mount Lemmon || Mount Lemmon Survey ||  || align=right data-sort-value="0.65" | 650 m || 
|-id=165 bgcolor=#d6d6d6
| 498165 ||  || — || October 11, 2007 || Catalina || CSS ||  || align=right | 2.4 km || 
|-id=166 bgcolor=#d6d6d6
| 498166 ||  || — || October 6, 2007 || Kitt Peak || Spacewatch ||  || align=right | 3.0 km || 
|-id=167 bgcolor=#d6d6d6
| 498167 ||  || — || October 6, 2007 || Kitt Peak || Spacewatch ||  || align=right | 2.0 km || 
|-id=168 bgcolor=#d6d6d6
| 498168 ||  || — || September 13, 2007 || Mount Lemmon || Mount Lemmon Survey ||  || align=right | 2.3 km || 
|-id=169 bgcolor=#d6d6d6
| 498169 ||  || — || September 20, 2007 || Catalina || CSS ||  || align=right | 2.7 km || 
|-id=170 bgcolor=#fefefe
| 498170 ||  || — || October 7, 2007 || Mount Lemmon || Mount Lemmon Survey ||  || align=right data-sort-value="0.47" | 470 m || 
|-id=171 bgcolor=#d6d6d6
| 498171 ||  || — || October 8, 2007 || Kitt Peak || Spacewatch ||  || align=right | 2.4 km || 
|-id=172 bgcolor=#fefefe
| 498172 ||  || — || October 8, 2007 || Kitt Peak || Spacewatch ||  || align=right data-sort-value="0.53" | 530 m || 
|-id=173 bgcolor=#d6d6d6
| 498173 ||  || — || October 8, 2007 || Kitt Peak || Spacewatch ||  || align=right | 2.1 km || 
|-id=174 bgcolor=#d6d6d6
| 498174 ||  || — || October 11, 2007 || Mount Lemmon || Mount Lemmon Survey ||  || align=right | 3.3 km || 
|-id=175 bgcolor=#d6d6d6
| 498175 ||  || — || October 11, 2007 || Mount Lemmon || Mount Lemmon Survey ||  || align=right | 2.2 km || 
|-id=176 bgcolor=#d6d6d6
| 498176 ||  || — || October 7, 2007 || Kitt Peak || Spacewatch || EOS || align=right | 1.7 km || 
|-id=177 bgcolor=#d6d6d6
| 498177 ||  || — || September 25, 2007 || Mount Lemmon || Mount Lemmon Survey ||  || align=right | 2.3 km || 
|-id=178 bgcolor=#d6d6d6
| 498178 ||  || — || October 7, 2007 || Kitt Peak || Spacewatch ||  || align=right | 2.6 km || 
|-id=179 bgcolor=#fefefe
| 498179 ||  || — || October 8, 2007 || Catalina || CSS ||  || align=right data-sort-value="0.62" | 620 m || 
|-id=180 bgcolor=#d6d6d6
| 498180 ||  || — || October 8, 2007 || Kitt Peak || Spacewatch || EOS || align=right | 1.6 km || 
|-id=181 bgcolor=#d6d6d6
| 498181 ||  || — || October 8, 2007 || Kitt Peak || Spacewatch ||  || align=right | 2.0 km || 
|-id=182 bgcolor=#d6d6d6
| 498182 ||  || — || October 9, 2007 || Mount Lemmon || Mount Lemmon Survey ||  || align=right | 1.8 km || 
|-id=183 bgcolor=#fefefe
| 498183 ||  || — || October 10, 2007 || Kitt Peak || Spacewatch ||  || align=right data-sort-value="0.73" | 730 m || 
|-id=184 bgcolor=#fefefe
| 498184 ||  || — || October 10, 2007 || Kitt Peak || Spacewatch ||  || align=right data-sort-value="0.69" | 690 m || 
|-id=185 bgcolor=#d6d6d6
| 498185 ||  || — || October 9, 2007 || Kitt Peak || Spacewatch || EOS || align=right | 1.9 km || 
|-id=186 bgcolor=#d6d6d6
| 498186 ||  || — || October 8, 2007 || Mount Lemmon || Mount Lemmon Survey ||  || align=right | 2.0 km || 
|-id=187 bgcolor=#d6d6d6
| 498187 ||  || — || October 4, 2007 || Kitt Peak || Spacewatch || TRP || align=right | 2.0 km || 
|-id=188 bgcolor=#d6d6d6
| 498188 ||  || — || September 9, 2007 || Mount Lemmon || Mount Lemmon Survey ||  || align=right | 2.7 km || 
|-id=189 bgcolor=#d6d6d6
| 498189 ||  || — || October 8, 2007 || Kitt Peak || Spacewatch ||  || align=right | 2.3 km || 
|-id=190 bgcolor=#d6d6d6
| 498190 ||  || — || October 12, 2007 || Kitt Peak || Spacewatch || KOR || align=right | 1.2 km || 
|-id=191 bgcolor=#d6d6d6
| 498191 ||  || — || October 12, 2007 || Kitt Peak || Spacewatch ||  || align=right | 2.3 km || 
|-id=192 bgcolor=#fefefe
| 498192 ||  || — || September 14, 2007 || Mount Lemmon || Mount Lemmon Survey || (2076) || align=right data-sort-value="0.85" | 850 m || 
|-id=193 bgcolor=#d6d6d6
| 498193 ||  || — || October 11, 2007 || Kitt Peak || Spacewatch || EOS || align=right | 1.6 km || 
|-id=194 bgcolor=#d6d6d6
| 498194 ||  || — || October 11, 2007 || Kitt Peak || Spacewatch ||  || align=right | 2.4 km || 
|-id=195 bgcolor=#d6d6d6
| 498195 ||  || — || October 11, 2007 || Kitt Peak || Spacewatch || EOS || align=right | 1.7 km || 
|-id=196 bgcolor=#d6d6d6
| 498196 ||  || — || October 11, 2007 || Kitt Peak || Spacewatch ||  || align=right | 3.2 km || 
|-id=197 bgcolor=#d6d6d6
| 498197 ||  || — || September 18, 2007 || Mount Lemmon || Mount Lemmon Survey ||  || align=right | 2.5 km || 
|-id=198 bgcolor=#fefefe
| 498198 ||  || — || October 13, 2007 || Catalina || CSS ||  || align=right data-sort-value="0.64" | 640 m || 
|-id=199 bgcolor=#d6d6d6
| 498199 ||  || — || October 10, 2007 || Mount Lemmon || Mount Lemmon Survey ||  || align=right | 2.5 km || 
|-id=200 bgcolor=#d6d6d6
| 498200 ||  || — || October 14, 2007 || Mount Lemmon || Mount Lemmon Survey ||  || align=right | 2.8 km || 
|}

498201–498300 

|-bgcolor=#d6d6d6
| 498201 ||  || — || October 11, 2007 || Mount Lemmon || Mount Lemmon Survey ||  || align=right | 2.4 km || 
|-id=202 bgcolor=#d6d6d6
| 498202 ||  || — || October 12, 2007 || Kitt Peak || Spacewatch || EOS || align=right | 1.3 km || 
|-id=203 bgcolor=#d6d6d6
| 498203 ||  || — || October 14, 2007 || Kitt Peak || Spacewatch ||  || align=right | 2.1 km || 
|-id=204 bgcolor=#d6d6d6
| 498204 ||  || — || October 6, 2007 || Kitt Peak || Spacewatch ||  || align=right | 3.5 km || 
|-id=205 bgcolor=#d6d6d6
| 498205 ||  || — || October 15, 2007 || Catalina || CSS ||  || align=right | 2.5 km || 
|-id=206 bgcolor=#d6d6d6
| 498206 ||  || — || October 7, 2007 || Kitt Peak || Spacewatch ||  || align=right | 2.7 km || 
|-id=207 bgcolor=#fefefe
| 498207 ||  || — || October 11, 2007 || Kitt Peak || Spacewatch ||  || align=right data-sort-value="0.66" | 660 m || 
|-id=208 bgcolor=#d6d6d6
| 498208 ||  || — || October 15, 2007 || Mount Lemmon || Mount Lemmon Survey ||  || align=right | 2.9 km || 
|-id=209 bgcolor=#fefefe
| 498209 ||  || — || September 12, 2007 || Catalina || CSS ||  || align=right data-sort-value="0.60" | 600 m || 
|-id=210 bgcolor=#d6d6d6
| 498210 ||  || — || October 12, 2007 || Kitt Peak || Spacewatch ||  || align=right | 2.3 km || 
|-id=211 bgcolor=#fefefe
| 498211 ||  || — || October 7, 2007 || Anderson Mesa || LONEOS ||  || align=right data-sort-value="0.68" | 680 m || 
|-id=212 bgcolor=#d6d6d6
| 498212 ||  || — || October 12, 2007 || Kitt Peak || Spacewatch || EOS || align=right | 1.7 km || 
|-id=213 bgcolor=#d6d6d6
| 498213 ||  || — || October 13, 2007 || Kitt Peak || Spacewatch || THM || align=right | 2.1 km || 
|-id=214 bgcolor=#fefefe
| 498214 ||  || — || October 4, 2007 || Kitt Peak || Spacewatch ||  || align=right data-sort-value="0.78" | 780 m || 
|-id=215 bgcolor=#d6d6d6
| 498215 ||  || — || October 10, 2007 || Kitt Peak || Spacewatch ||  || align=right | 2.2 km || 
|-id=216 bgcolor=#d6d6d6
| 498216 ||  || — || October 9, 2007 || Mount Lemmon || Mount Lemmon Survey ||  || align=right | 1.9 km || 
|-id=217 bgcolor=#E9E9E9
| 498217 ||  || — || October 8, 2007 || Mount Lemmon || Mount Lemmon Survey || AGN || align=right | 1.4 km || 
|-id=218 bgcolor=#d6d6d6
| 498218 ||  || — || October 10, 2007 || Mount Lemmon || Mount Lemmon Survey ||  || align=right | 3.0 km || 
|-id=219 bgcolor=#d6d6d6
| 498219 ||  || — || October 7, 2007 || Mount Lemmon || Mount Lemmon Survey ||  || align=right | 2.1 km || 
|-id=220 bgcolor=#d6d6d6
| 498220 ||  || — || October 12, 2007 || Socorro || LINEAR || EOS || align=right | 2.1 km || 
|-id=221 bgcolor=#d6d6d6
| 498221 ||  || — || October 7, 2007 || Mount Lemmon || Mount Lemmon Survey || THM || align=right | 1.9 km || 
|-id=222 bgcolor=#d6d6d6
| 498222 ||  || — || October 10, 2007 || Kitt Peak || Spacewatch ||  || align=right | 2.9 km || 
|-id=223 bgcolor=#d6d6d6
| 498223 ||  || — || October 10, 2007 || Kitt Peak || Spacewatch ||  || align=right | 2.7 km || 
|-id=224 bgcolor=#d6d6d6
| 498224 ||  || — || October 15, 2007 || Socorro || LINEAR ||  || align=right | 3.8 km || 
|-id=225 bgcolor=#fefefe
| 498225 ||  || — || September 13, 2007 || Mount Lemmon || Mount Lemmon Survey || H || align=right data-sort-value="0.63" | 630 m || 
|-id=226 bgcolor=#fefefe
| 498226 ||  || — || October 16, 2007 || Mount Lemmon || Mount Lemmon Survey ||  || align=right data-sort-value="0.55" | 550 m || 
|-id=227 bgcolor=#d6d6d6
| 498227 ||  || — || September 9, 2007 || Mount Lemmon || Mount Lemmon Survey || VER || align=right | 1.9 km || 
|-id=228 bgcolor=#d6d6d6
| 498228 ||  || — || October 7, 2007 || Mount Lemmon || Mount Lemmon Survey ||  || align=right | 2.2 km || 
|-id=229 bgcolor=#d6d6d6
| 498229 ||  || — || October 12, 2007 || Kitt Peak || Spacewatch ||  || align=right | 2.2 km || 
|-id=230 bgcolor=#fefefe
| 498230 ||  || — || October 8, 2007 || Kitt Peak || Spacewatch ||  || align=right data-sort-value="0.57" | 570 m || 
|-id=231 bgcolor=#fefefe
| 498231 ||  || — || September 10, 2007 || Kitt Peak || Spacewatch ||  || align=right data-sort-value="0.59" | 590 m || 
|-id=232 bgcolor=#d6d6d6
| 498232 ||  || — || October 16, 2007 || Mount Lemmon || Mount Lemmon Survey ||  || align=right | 1.5 km || 
|-id=233 bgcolor=#fefefe
| 498233 ||  || — || October 24, 2007 || Mount Lemmon || Mount Lemmon Survey ||  || align=right data-sort-value="0.68" | 680 m || 
|-id=234 bgcolor=#d6d6d6
| 498234 ||  || — || October 12, 2007 || Kitt Peak || Spacewatch ||  || align=right | 2.1 km || 
|-id=235 bgcolor=#fefefe
| 498235 ||  || — || October 12, 2007 || Kitt Peak || Spacewatch ||  || align=right data-sort-value="0.54" | 540 m || 
|-id=236 bgcolor=#d6d6d6
| 498236 ||  || — || October 11, 2007 || Kitt Peak || Spacewatch ||  || align=right | 2.6 km || 
|-id=237 bgcolor=#d6d6d6
| 498237 ||  || — || October 10, 2007 || Kitt Peak || Spacewatch || THM || align=right | 2.1 km || 
|-id=238 bgcolor=#d6d6d6
| 498238 ||  || — || October 7, 2007 || Mount Lemmon || Mount Lemmon Survey ||  || align=right | 2.2 km || 
|-id=239 bgcolor=#d6d6d6
| 498239 ||  || — || October 10, 2007 || Kitt Peak || Spacewatch ||  || align=right | 2.3 km || 
|-id=240 bgcolor=#fefefe
| 498240 ||  || — || October 30, 2007 || Mount Lemmon || Mount Lemmon Survey ||  || align=right data-sort-value="0.47" | 470 m || 
|-id=241 bgcolor=#d6d6d6
| 498241 ||  || — || October 9, 2007 || Kitt Peak || Spacewatch ||  || align=right | 2.3 km || 
|-id=242 bgcolor=#d6d6d6
| 498242 ||  || — || October 7, 2007 || Mount Lemmon || Mount Lemmon Survey ||  || align=right | 1.9 km || 
|-id=243 bgcolor=#fefefe
| 498243 ||  || — || October 30, 2007 || Mount Lemmon || Mount Lemmon Survey ||  || align=right data-sort-value="0.50" | 500 m || 
|-id=244 bgcolor=#fefefe
| 498244 ||  || — || September 18, 2007 || Mount Lemmon || Mount Lemmon Survey ||  || align=right data-sort-value="0.62" | 620 m || 
|-id=245 bgcolor=#d6d6d6
| 498245 ||  || — || October 12, 2007 || Kitt Peak || Spacewatch || EOS || align=right | 2.8 km || 
|-id=246 bgcolor=#d6d6d6
| 498246 ||  || — || October 30, 2007 || Mount Lemmon || Mount Lemmon Survey || THM || align=right | 1.8 km || 
|-id=247 bgcolor=#d6d6d6
| 498247 ||  || — || October 12, 2007 || Kitt Peak || Spacewatch || KOR || align=right | 2.2 km || 
|-id=248 bgcolor=#fefefe
| 498248 ||  || — || October 30, 2007 || Mount Lemmon || Mount Lemmon Survey ||  || align=right data-sort-value="0.58" | 580 m || 
|-id=249 bgcolor=#d6d6d6
| 498249 ||  || — || October 30, 2007 || Mount Lemmon || Mount Lemmon Survey || EOS || align=right | 1.4 km || 
|-id=250 bgcolor=#d6d6d6
| 498250 ||  || — || October 17, 2007 || Mount Lemmon || Mount Lemmon Survey || HYG || align=right | 2.3 km || 
|-id=251 bgcolor=#fefefe
| 498251 ||  || — || October 30, 2007 || Kitt Peak || Spacewatch ||  || align=right data-sort-value="0.58" | 580 m || 
|-id=252 bgcolor=#d6d6d6
| 498252 ||  || — || October 30, 2007 || Kitt Peak || Spacewatch ||  || align=right | 1.9 km || 
|-id=253 bgcolor=#d6d6d6
| 498253 ||  || — || October 11, 2007 || Kitt Peak || Spacewatch ||  || align=right | 2.6 km || 
|-id=254 bgcolor=#fefefe
| 498254 ||  || — || October 30, 2007 || Catalina || CSS ||  || align=right data-sort-value="0.72" | 720 m || 
|-id=255 bgcolor=#d6d6d6
| 498255 ||  || — || October 31, 2007 || Kitt Peak || Spacewatch ||  || align=right | 2.9 km || 
|-id=256 bgcolor=#d6d6d6
| 498256 ||  || — || October 16, 2007 || Mount Lemmon || Mount Lemmon Survey ||  || align=right | 2.2 km || 
|-id=257 bgcolor=#fefefe
| 498257 ||  || — || October 31, 2007 || Kitt Peak || Spacewatch ||  || align=right data-sort-value="0.56" | 560 m || 
|-id=258 bgcolor=#d6d6d6
| 498258 ||  || — || October 12, 2007 || Kitt Peak || Spacewatch ||  || align=right | 2.0 km || 
|-id=259 bgcolor=#d6d6d6
| 498259 ||  || — || October 15, 2007 || Kitt Peak || Spacewatch || EOS || align=right | 1.5 km || 
|-id=260 bgcolor=#d6d6d6
| 498260 ||  || — || September 14, 2007 || Mount Lemmon || Mount Lemmon Survey ||  || align=right | 2.1 km || 
|-id=261 bgcolor=#d6d6d6
| 498261 ||  || — || October 4, 2007 || Kitt Peak || Spacewatch || EOS || align=right | 1.8 km || 
|-id=262 bgcolor=#d6d6d6
| 498262 ||  || — || September 10, 2007 || Kitt Peak || Spacewatch ||  || align=right | 2.2 km || 
|-id=263 bgcolor=#fefefe
| 498263 ||  || — || October 24, 2007 || Mount Lemmon || Mount Lemmon Survey ||  || align=right data-sort-value="0.65" | 650 m || 
|-id=264 bgcolor=#d6d6d6
| 498264 ||  || — || October 19, 2007 || Mount Lemmon || Mount Lemmon Survey ||  || align=right | 2.5 km || 
|-id=265 bgcolor=#d6d6d6
| 498265 ||  || — || September 14, 2007 || Mount Lemmon || Mount Lemmon Survey ||  || align=right | 2.0 km || 
|-id=266 bgcolor=#fefefe
| 498266 ||  || — || October 19, 2007 || Kitt Peak || Spacewatch ||  || align=right data-sort-value="0.70" | 700 m || 
|-id=267 bgcolor=#d6d6d6
| 498267 ||  || — || October 15, 2007 || Mount Lemmon || Mount Lemmon Survey || EOS || align=right | 3.1 km || 
|-id=268 bgcolor=#d6d6d6
| 498268 ||  || — || October 16, 2007 || Catalina || CSS ||  || align=right | 3.1 km || 
|-id=269 bgcolor=#fefefe
| 498269 ||  || — || November 3, 2007 || Gnosca || S. Sposetti ||  || align=right data-sort-value="0.69" | 690 m || 
|-id=270 bgcolor=#fefefe
| 498270 ||  || — || September 26, 2007 || Mount Lemmon || Mount Lemmon Survey ||  || align=right data-sort-value="0.69" | 690 m || 
|-id=271 bgcolor=#fefefe
| 498271 ||  || — || September 25, 2007 || Mount Lemmon || Mount Lemmon Survey || H || align=right data-sort-value="0.58" | 580 m || 
|-id=272 bgcolor=#d6d6d6
| 498272 ||  || — || November 1, 2007 || Kitt Peak || Spacewatch ||  || align=right | 2.3 km || 
|-id=273 bgcolor=#d6d6d6
| 498273 ||  || — || November 2, 2007 || Mount Lemmon || Mount Lemmon Survey ||  || align=right | 2.3 km || 
|-id=274 bgcolor=#fefefe
| 498274 ||  || — || October 11, 2007 || Mount Lemmon || Mount Lemmon Survey ||  || align=right data-sort-value="0.66" | 660 m || 
|-id=275 bgcolor=#fefefe
| 498275 ||  || — || October 7, 2007 || Kitt Peak || Spacewatch ||  || align=right data-sort-value="0.43" | 430 m || 
|-id=276 bgcolor=#fefefe
| 498276 ||  || — || October 19, 2007 || Kitt Peak || Spacewatch ||  || align=right data-sort-value="0.60" | 600 m || 
|-id=277 bgcolor=#fefefe
| 498277 ||  || — || November 3, 2007 || Kitt Peak || Spacewatch ||  || align=right data-sort-value="0.61" | 610 m || 
|-id=278 bgcolor=#d6d6d6
| 498278 ||  || — || November 1, 2007 || Kitt Peak || Spacewatch || EOS || align=right | 1.5 km || 
|-id=279 bgcolor=#d6d6d6
| 498279 ||  || — || November 1, 2007 || Kitt Peak || Spacewatch ||  || align=right | 2.4 km || 
|-id=280 bgcolor=#fefefe
| 498280 ||  || — || October 9, 2007 || Kitt Peak || Spacewatch ||  || align=right data-sort-value="0.52" | 520 m || 
|-id=281 bgcolor=#fefefe
| 498281 ||  || — || November 1, 2007 || Kitt Peak || Spacewatch ||  || align=right data-sort-value="0.68" | 680 m || 
|-id=282 bgcolor=#d6d6d6
| 498282 ||  || — || October 9, 2007 || Kitt Peak || Spacewatch ||  || align=right | 3.5 km || 
|-id=283 bgcolor=#d6d6d6
| 498283 ||  || — || October 9, 2007 || Kitt Peak || Spacewatch || EOS || align=right | 1.8 km || 
|-id=284 bgcolor=#fefefe
| 498284 ||  || — || November 1, 2007 || Kitt Peak || Spacewatch ||  || align=right data-sort-value="0.58" | 580 m || 
|-id=285 bgcolor=#fefefe
| 498285 ||  || — || November 1, 2007 || Kitt Peak || Spacewatch ||  || align=right data-sort-value="0.53" | 530 m || 
|-id=286 bgcolor=#fefefe
| 498286 ||  || — || November 1, 2007 || Kitt Peak || Spacewatch ||  || align=right data-sort-value="0.76" | 760 m || 
|-id=287 bgcolor=#d6d6d6
| 498287 ||  || — || November 2, 2007 || Kitt Peak || Spacewatch ||  || align=right | 2.3 km || 
|-id=288 bgcolor=#fefefe
| 498288 ||  || — || October 21, 2007 || Catalina || CSS || H || align=right data-sort-value="0.80" | 800 m || 
|-id=289 bgcolor=#fefefe
| 498289 ||  || — || October 8, 2007 || Mount Lemmon || Mount Lemmon Survey ||  || align=right data-sort-value="0.60" | 600 m || 
|-id=290 bgcolor=#d6d6d6
| 498290 ||  || — || October 21, 2007 || Kitt Peak || Spacewatch || EOS || align=right | 2.3 km || 
|-id=291 bgcolor=#fefefe
| 498291 ||  || — || November 3, 2007 || Kitt Peak || Spacewatch || MAS || align=right data-sort-value="0.64" | 640 m || 
|-id=292 bgcolor=#d6d6d6
| 498292 ||  || — || November 3, 2007 || Kitt Peak || Spacewatch ||  || align=right | 1.6 km || 
|-id=293 bgcolor=#d6d6d6
| 498293 ||  || — || November 2, 2007 || Socorro || LINEAR ||  || align=right | 3.7 km || 
|-id=294 bgcolor=#fefefe
| 498294 ||  || — || October 12, 2007 || Mount Lemmon || Mount Lemmon Survey ||  || align=right data-sort-value="0.61" | 610 m || 
|-id=295 bgcolor=#fefefe
| 498295 ||  || — || November 1, 2007 || Kitt Peak || Spacewatch ||  || align=right data-sort-value="0.58" | 580 m || 
|-id=296 bgcolor=#fefefe
| 498296 ||  || — || October 15, 2007 || Kitt Peak || Spacewatch ||  || align=right data-sort-value="0.57" | 570 m || 
|-id=297 bgcolor=#fefefe
| 498297 ||  || — || November 2, 2007 || Kitt Peak || Spacewatch ||  || align=right data-sort-value="0.78" | 780 m || 
|-id=298 bgcolor=#d6d6d6
| 498298 ||  || — || November 2, 2007 || Kitt Peak || Spacewatch ||  || align=right | 3.0 km || 
|-id=299 bgcolor=#d6d6d6
| 498299 ||  || — || October 14, 2007 || Mount Lemmon || Mount Lemmon Survey ||  || align=right | 2.5 km || 
|-id=300 bgcolor=#d6d6d6
| 498300 ||  || — || November 3, 2007 || Kitt Peak || Spacewatch ||  || align=right | 2.1 km || 
|}

498301–498400 

|-bgcolor=#d6d6d6
| 498301 ||  || — || October 17, 2007 || Mount Lemmon || Mount Lemmon Survey || VER || align=right | 2.8 km || 
|-id=302 bgcolor=#d6d6d6
| 498302 ||  || — || November 3, 2007 || Kitt Peak || Spacewatch || THM || align=right | 2.1 km || 
|-id=303 bgcolor=#d6d6d6
| 498303 ||  || — || September 15, 2007 || Mount Lemmon || Mount Lemmon Survey ||  || align=right | 2.3 km || 
|-id=304 bgcolor=#d6d6d6
| 498304 ||  || — || October 20, 2007 || Mount Lemmon || Mount Lemmon Survey ||  || align=right | 2.1 km || 
|-id=305 bgcolor=#d6d6d6
| 498305 ||  || — || October 20, 2007 || Mount Lemmon || Mount Lemmon Survey || EMA || align=right | 2.7 km || 
|-id=306 bgcolor=#fefefe
| 498306 ||  || — || September 25, 2007 || Mount Lemmon || Mount Lemmon Survey || V || align=right data-sort-value="0.54" | 540 m || 
|-id=307 bgcolor=#fefefe
| 498307 ||  || — || September 13, 2007 || Mount Lemmon || Mount Lemmon Survey ||  || align=right data-sort-value="0.58" | 580 m || 
|-id=308 bgcolor=#d6d6d6
| 498308 ||  || — || October 12, 2007 || Kitt Peak || Spacewatch ||  || align=right | 2.0 km || 
|-id=309 bgcolor=#fefefe
| 498309 ||  || — || October 16, 2007 || Kitt Peak || Spacewatch ||  || align=right data-sort-value="0.68" | 680 m || 
|-id=310 bgcolor=#d6d6d6
| 498310 ||  || — || October 21, 2007 || Kitt Peak || Spacewatch ||  || align=right | 2.1 km || 
|-id=311 bgcolor=#fefefe
| 498311 ||  || — || October 17, 2007 || Mount Lemmon || Mount Lemmon Survey ||  || align=right data-sort-value="0.54" | 540 m || 
|-id=312 bgcolor=#fefefe
| 498312 ||  || — || November 4, 2007 || Kitt Peak || Spacewatch || V || align=right data-sort-value="0.52" | 520 m || 
|-id=313 bgcolor=#d6d6d6
| 498313 ||  || — || November 4, 2007 || Kitt Peak || Spacewatch ||  || align=right | 2.5 km || 
|-id=314 bgcolor=#d6d6d6
| 498314 ||  || — || November 4, 2007 || Kitt Peak || Spacewatch ||  || align=right | 2.3 km || 
|-id=315 bgcolor=#d6d6d6
| 498315 ||  || — || November 4, 2007 || Kitt Peak || Spacewatch ||  || align=right | 2.8 km || 
|-id=316 bgcolor=#fefefe
| 498316 ||  || — || October 20, 2007 || Mount Lemmon || Mount Lemmon Survey ||  || align=right data-sort-value="0.80" | 800 m || 
|-id=317 bgcolor=#fefefe
| 498317 ||  || — || November 5, 2007 || Kitt Peak || Spacewatch ||  || align=right data-sort-value="0.63" | 630 m || 
|-id=318 bgcolor=#fefefe
| 498318 ||  || — || November 5, 2007 || Kitt Peak || Spacewatch ||  || align=right data-sort-value="0.61" | 610 m || 
|-id=319 bgcolor=#d6d6d6
| 498319 ||  || — || October 20, 2007 || Mount Lemmon || Mount Lemmon Survey || EOS || align=right | 1.8 km || 
|-id=320 bgcolor=#d6d6d6
| 498320 ||  || — || November 5, 2007 || Kitt Peak || Spacewatch || EOS || align=right | 2.7 km || 
|-id=321 bgcolor=#d6d6d6
| 498321 ||  || — || October 15, 2007 || Mount Lemmon || Mount Lemmon Survey ||  || align=right | 2.7 km || 
|-id=322 bgcolor=#fefefe
| 498322 ||  || — || November 6, 2007 || Kitt Peak || Spacewatch ||  || align=right data-sort-value="0.77" | 770 m || 
|-id=323 bgcolor=#fefefe
| 498323 ||  || — || November 6, 2007 || Kitt Peak || Spacewatch || H || align=right data-sort-value="0.74" | 740 m || 
|-id=324 bgcolor=#d6d6d6
| 498324 ||  || — || October 4, 2007 || Kitt Peak || Spacewatch ||  || align=right | 2.8 km || 
|-id=325 bgcolor=#d6d6d6
| 498325 ||  || — || October 8, 2007 || Kitt Peak || Spacewatch ||  || align=right | 1.8 km || 
|-id=326 bgcolor=#fefefe
| 498326 ||  || — || November 8, 2007 || Catalina || CSS ||  || align=right data-sort-value="0.75" | 750 m || 
|-id=327 bgcolor=#fefefe
| 498327 ||  || — || October 31, 2007 || Kitt Peak || Spacewatch ||  || align=right data-sort-value="0.75" | 750 m || 
|-id=328 bgcolor=#fefefe
| 498328 ||  || — || October 12, 2007 || Kitt Peak || Spacewatch ||  || align=right data-sort-value="0.57" | 570 m || 
|-id=329 bgcolor=#fefefe
| 498329 ||  || — || November 9, 2007 || Kitt Peak || Spacewatch ||  || align=right data-sort-value="0.54" | 540 m || 
|-id=330 bgcolor=#fefefe
| 498330 ||  || — || November 9, 2007 || Kitt Peak || Spacewatch ||  || align=right data-sort-value="0.56" | 560 m || 
|-id=331 bgcolor=#fefefe
| 498331 ||  || — || October 15, 2007 || Mount Lemmon || Mount Lemmon Survey ||  || align=right data-sort-value="0.79" | 790 m || 
|-id=332 bgcolor=#d6d6d6
| 498332 ||  || — || November 12, 2007 || Mount Lemmon || Mount Lemmon Survey ||  || align=right | 3.2 km || 
|-id=333 bgcolor=#d6d6d6
| 498333 ||  || — || November 7, 2007 || Kitt Peak || Spacewatch ||  || align=right | 1.8 km || 
|-id=334 bgcolor=#fefefe
| 498334 ||  || — || November 1, 2007 || Kitt Peak || Spacewatch || H || align=right data-sort-value="0.67" | 670 m || 
|-id=335 bgcolor=#fefefe
| 498335 ||  || — || November 9, 2007 || Kitt Peak || Spacewatch ||  || align=right data-sort-value="0.68" | 680 m || 
|-id=336 bgcolor=#d6d6d6
| 498336 ||  || — || October 11, 2007 || Kitt Peak || Spacewatch ||  || align=right | 2.0 km || 
|-id=337 bgcolor=#d6d6d6
| 498337 ||  || — || November 5, 2007 || Kitt Peak || Spacewatch ||  || align=right | 2.5 km || 
|-id=338 bgcolor=#d6d6d6
| 498338 ||  || — || November 9, 2007 || Catalina || CSS || TIR || align=right | 3.5 km || 
|-id=339 bgcolor=#d6d6d6
| 498339 ||  || — || November 1, 2007 || Kitt Peak || Spacewatch ||  || align=right | 2.2 km || 
|-id=340 bgcolor=#d6d6d6
| 498340 ||  || — || November 13, 2007 || Anderson Mesa || LONEOS ||  || align=right | 3.4 km || 
|-id=341 bgcolor=#fefefe
| 498341 ||  || — || September 9, 2007 || Mount Lemmon || Mount Lemmon Survey ||  || align=right data-sort-value="0.60" | 600 m || 
|-id=342 bgcolor=#d6d6d6
| 498342 ||  || — || October 12, 2007 || Mount Lemmon || Mount Lemmon Survey ||  || align=right | 2.5 km || 
|-id=343 bgcolor=#d6d6d6
| 498343 ||  || — || November 13, 2007 || Mount Lemmon || Mount Lemmon Survey ||  || align=right | 2.7 km || 
|-id=344 bgcolor=#FA8072
| 498344 ||  || — || October 10, 2007 || Catalina || CSS ||  || align=right | 1.5 km || 
|-id=345 bgcolor=#d6d6d6
| 498345 ||  || — || November 12, 2007 || Catalina || CSS || HYG || align=right | 2.8 km || 
|-id=346 bgcolor=#d6d6d6
| 498346 ||  || — || November 14, 2007 || Kitt Peak || Spacewatch ||  || align=right | 3.2 km || 
|-id=347 bgcolor=#d6d6d6
| 498347 ||  || — || November 3, 2007 || Kitt Peak || Spacewatch ||  || align=right | 2.7 km || 
|-id=348 bgcolor=#fefefe
| 498348 ||  || — || November 13, 2007 || Anderson Mesa || LONEOS ||  || align=right data-sort-value="0.60" | 600 m || 
|-id=349 bgcolor=#d6d6d6
| 498349 ||  || — || October 17, 2007 || Catalina || CSS ||  || align=right | 3.1 km || 
|-id=350 bgcolor=#d6d6d6
| 498350 ||  || — || October 17, 2007 || Catalina || CSS ||  || align=right | 2.5 km || 
|-id=351 bgcolor=#d6d6d6
| 498351 ||  || — || November 3, 2007 || Mount Lemmon || Mount Lemmon Survey ||  || align=right | 3.1 km || 
|-id=352 bgcolor=#fefefe
| 498352 ||  || — || November 2, 2007 || Kitt Peak || Spacewatch ||  || align=right data-sort-value="0.62" | 620 m || 
|-id=353 bgcolor=#fefefe
| 498353 ||  || — || November 2, 2007 || Kitt Peak || Spacewatch ||  || align=right data-sort-value="0.67" | 670 m || 
|-id=354 bgcolor=#d6d6d6
| 498354 ||  || — || November 8, 2007 || Catalina || CSS ||  || align=right | 2.7 km || 
|-id=355 bgcolor=#d6d6d6
| 498355 ||  || — || November 2, 2007 || Mount Lemmon || Mount Lemmon Survey ||  || align=right | 3.2 km || 
|-id=356 bgcolor=#d6d6d6
| 498356 ||  || — || November 3, 2007 || Kitt Peak || Spacewatch ||  || align=right | 3.1 km || 
|-id=357 bgcolor=#d6d6d6
| 498357 ||  || — || November 2, 2007 || Kitt Peak || Spacewatch ||  || align=right | 2.2 km || 
|-id=358 bgcolor=#d6d6d6
| 498358 ||  || — || November 4, 2007 || Mount Lemmon || Mount Lemmon Survey || EOS || align=right | 1.8 km || 
|-id=359 bgcolor=#d6d6d6
| 498359 ||  || — || November 5, 2007 || Kitt Peak || Spacewatch ||  || align=right | 4.1 km || 
|-id=360 bgcolor=#d6d6d6
| 498360 ||  || — || November 5, 2007 || Kitt Peak || Spacewatch ||  || align=right | 2.9 km || 
|-id=361 bgcolor=#d6d6d6
| 498361 ||  || — || November 1, 2007 || Kitt Peak || Spacewatch || EOS || align=right | 2.1 km || 
|-id=362 bgcolor=#d6d6d6
| 498362 ||  || — || November 1, 2007 || Kitt Peak || Spacewatch ||  || align=right | 2.7 km || 
|-id=363 bgcolor=#d6d6d6
| 498363 ||  || — || November 2, 2007 || Kitt Peak || Spacewatch || EOS || align=right | 1.9 km || 
|-id=364 bgcolor=#d6d6d6
| 498364 ||  || — || November 8, 2007 || Socorro || LINEAR || URS || align=right | 3.1 km || 
|-id=365 bgcolor=#fefefe
| 498365 ||  || — || November 8, 2007 || Mount Lemmon || Mount Lemmon Survey ||  || align=right data-sort-value="0.81" | 810 m || 
|-id=366 bgcolor=#fefefe
| 498366 ||  || — || November 8, 2007 || Mount Lemmon || Mount Lemmon Survey ||  || align=right data-sort-value="0.61" | 610 m || 
|-id=367 bgcolor=#d6d6d6
| 498367 ||  || — || November 1, 2007 || Kitt Peak || Spacewatch ||  || align=right | 2.8 km || 
|-id=368 bgcolor=#d6d6d6
| 498368 ||  || — || November 4, 2007 || Kitt Peak || Spacewatch ||  || align=right | 2.0 km || 
|-id=369 bgcolor=#d6d6d6
| 498369 ||  || — || November 4, 2007 || Kitt Peak || Spacewatch ||  || align=right | 2.5 km || 
|-id=370 bgcolor=#d6d6d6
| 498370 ||  || — || November 3, 2007 || Kitt Peak || Spacewatch ||  || align=right | 2.4 km || 
|-id=371 bgcolor=#d6d6d6
| 498371 ||  || — || November 7, 2007 || Mount Lemmon || Mount Lemmon Survey ||  || align=right | 2.9 km || 
|-id=372 bgcolor=#d6d6d6
| 498372 ||  || — || November 14, 2007 || Kitt Peak || Spacewatch || EOS || align=right | 2.7 km || 
|-id=373 bgcolor=#d6d6d6
| 498373 ||  || — || November 5, 2007 || Kitt Peak || Spacewatch ||  || align=right | 2.7 km || 
|-id=374 bgcolor=#fefefe
| 498374 ||  || — || October 9, 2007 || Kitt Peak || Spacewatch ||  || align=right data-sort-value="0.66" | 660 m || 
|-id=375 bgcolor=#fefefe
| 498375 ||  || — || October 21, 2007 || Kitt Peak || Spacewatch ||  || align=right data-sort-value="0.53" | 530 m || 
|-id=376 bgcolor=#d6d6d6
| 498376 ||  || — || November 1, 2007 || Kitt Peak || Spacewatch ||  || align=right | 2.2 km || 
|-id=377 bgcolor=#d6d6d6
| 498377 ||  || — || October 10, 2007 || Kitt Peak || Spacewatch || EOS || align=right | 1.8 km || 
|-id=378 bgcolor=#d6d6d6
| 498378 ||  || — || November 2, 2007 || Kitt Peak || Spacewatch || EMA || align=right | 2.8 km || 
|-id=379 bgcolor=#d6d6d6
| 498379 ||  || — || October 10, 2007 || Kitt Peak || Spacewatch || HYG || align=right | 2.1 km || 
|-id=380 bgcolor=#d6d6d6
| 498380 ||  || — || November 3, 2007 || Kitt Peak || Spacewatch ||  || align=right | 2.3 km || 
|-id=381 bgcolor=#fefefe
| 498381 ||  || — || September 18, 2007 || Mount Lemmon || Mount Lemmon Survey ||  || align=right data-sort-value="0.55" | 550 m || 
|-id=382 bgcolor=#d6d6d6
| 498382 ||  || — || November 3, 2007 || Mount Lemmon || Mount Lemmon Survey ||  || align=right | 2.5 km || 
|-id=383 bgcolor=#d6d6d6
| 498383 ||  || — || November 8, 2007 || Kitt Peak || Spacewatch ||  || align=right | 1.7 km || 
|-id=384 bgcolor=#d6d6d6
| 498384 ||  || — || November 19, 2007 || Kitt Peak || Spacewatch ||  || align=right | 2.5 km || 
|-id=385 bgcolor=#d6d6d6
| 498385 ||  || — || October 20, 2007 || Mount Lemmon || Mount Lemmon Survey ||  || align=right | 2.8 km || 
|-id=386 bgcolor=#fefefe
| 498386 ||  || — || October 14, 2007 || Mount Lemmon || Mount Lemmon Survey ||  || align=right data-sort-value="0.72" | 720 m || 
|-id=387 bgcolor=#fefefe
| 498387 ||  || — || November 12, 2007 || Socorro || LINEAR ||  || align=right data-sort-value="0.74" | 740 m || 
|-id=388 bgcolor=#d6d6d6
| 498388 ||  || — || November 2, 2007 || Mount Lemmon || Mount Lemmon Survey ||  || align=right | 3.4 km || 
|-id=389 bgcolor=#d6d6d6
| 498389 ||  || — || December 5, 2007 || Mount Lemmon || Mount Lemmon Survey || THM || align=right | 2.0 km || 
|-id=390 bgcolor=#fefefe
| 498390 ||  || — || December 13, 2007 || Socorro || LINEAR || H || align=right data-sort-value="0.56" | 560 m || 
|-id=391 bgcolor=#d6d6d6
| 498391 ||  || — || December 15, 2007 || Bergisch Gladbach || W. Bickel || VER || align=right | 2.3 km || 
|-id=392 bgcolor=#fefefe
| 498392 ||  || — || October 21, 2007 || Mount Lemmon || Mount Lemmon Survey ||  || align=right data-sort-value="0.69" | 690 m || 
|-id=393 bgcolor=#d6d6d6
| 498393 ||  || — || December 4, 2007 || Kitt Peak || Spacewatch || HYG || align=right | 2.5 km || 
|-id=394 bgcolor=#fefefe
| 498394 ||  || — || November 9, 2007 || XuYi || PMO NEO ||  || align=right data-sort-value="0.82" | 820 m || 
|-id=395 bgcolor=#d6d6d6
| 498395 ||  || — || October 16, 2007 || Mount Lemmon || Mount Lemmon Survey ||  || align=right | 2.2 km || 
|-id=396 bgcolor=#fefefe
| 498396 ||  || — || November 18, 2007 || Kitt Peak || Spacewatch ||  || align=right data-sort-value="0.64" | 640 m || 
|-id=397 bgcolor=#fefefe
| 498397 ||  || — || December 14, 2007 || Mount Lemmon || Mount Lemmon Survey || H || align=right data-sort-value="0.89" | 890 m || 
|-id=398 bgcolor=#fefefe
| 498398 ||  || — || December 4, 2007 || Mount Lemmon || Mount Lemmon Survey ||  || align=right data-sort-value="0.42" | 420 m || 
|-id=399 bgcolor=#fefefe
| 498399 ||  || — || December 4, 2007 || Kitt Peak || Spacewatch ||  || align=right data-sort-value="0.77" | 770 m || 
|-id=400 bgcolor=#fefefe
| 498400 ||  || — || November 1, 2007 || Kitt Peak || Spacewatch ||  || align=right data-sort-value="0.64" | 640 m || 
|}

498401–498500 

|-bgcolor=#d6d6d6
| 498401 ||  || — || October 15, 2007 || Mount Lemmon || Mount Lemmon Survey || THM || align=right | 2.2 km || 
|-id=402 bgcolor=#d6d6d6
| 498402 ||  || — || November 18, 2007 || Mount Lemmon || Mount Lemmon Survey || THB || align=right | 3.8 km || 
|-id=403 bgcolor=#fefefe
| 498403 ||  || — || December 30, 2007 || Kitt Peak || Spacewatch || MAS || align=right data-sort-value="0.54" | 540 m || 
|-id=404 bgcolor=#fefefe
| 498404 ||  || — || December 30, 2007 || Mount Lemmon || Mount Lemmon Survey || H || align=right data-sort-value="0.59" | 590 m || 
|-id=405 bgcolor=#d6d6d6
| 498405 ||  || — || December 28, 2007 || Kitt Peak || Spacewatch || TIR || align=right | 3.6 km || 
|-id=406 bgcolor=#d6d6d6
| 498406 ||  || — || November 3, 2007 || Mount Lemmon || Mount Lemmon Survey ||  || align=right | 2.1 km || 
|-id=407 bgcolor=#d6d6d6
| 498407 ||  || — || December 28, 2007 || Kitt Peak || Spacewatch || LIX || align=right | 3.5 km || 
|-id=408 bgcolor=#d6d6d6
| 498408 ||  || — || December 13, 2007 || Socorro || LINEAR ||  || align=right | 3.4 km || 
|-id=409 bgcolor=#d6d6d6
| 498409 ||  || — || December 15, 2007 || Socorro || LINEAR || LIX || align=right | 3.1 km || 
|-id=410 bgcolor=#d6d6d6
| 498410 ||  || — || December 18, 2007 || Mount Lemmon || Mount Lemmon Survey || EUP || align=right | 3.4 km || 
|-id=411 bgcolor=#E9E9E9
| 498411 ||  || — || December 16, 2007 || Catalina || CSS ||  || align=right | 1.7 km || 
|-id=412 bgcolor=#d6d6d6
| 498412 ||  || — || December 19, 2007 || Socorro || LINEAR || EUP || align=right | 3.7 km || 
|-id=413 bgcolor=#d6d6d6
| 498413 ||  || — || January 6, 2008 || La Sagra || OAM Obs. ||  || align=right | 3.7 km || 
|-id=414 bgcolor=#d6d6d6
| 498414 ||  || — || January 7, 2008 || Lulin || LUSS ||  || align=right | 2.6 km || 
|-id=415 bgcolor=#d6d6d6
| 498415 ||  || — || December 30, 2007 || Kitt Peak || Spacewatch ||  || align=right | 2.6 km || 
|-id=416 bgcolor=#fefefe
| 498416 ||  || — || January 10, 2008 || Kitt Peak || Spacewatch ||  || align=right data-sort-value="0.77" | 770 m || 
|-id=417 bgcolor=#fefefe
| 498417 ||  || — || January 10, 2008 || Mount Lemmon || Mount Lemmon Survey || MAS || align=right data-sort-value="0.73" | 730 m || 
|-id=418 bgcolor=#fefefe
| 498418 ||  || — || January 10, 2008 || Mount Lemmon || Mount Lemmon Survey ||  || align=right data-sort-value="0.76" | 760 m || 
|-id=419 bgcolor=#fefefe
| 498419 ||  || — || January 10, 2008 || Mount Lemmon || Mount Lemmon Survey ||  || align=right | 1.6 km || 
|-id=420 bgcolor=#fefefe
| 498420 ||  || — || January 8, 2008 || Altschwendt || W. Ries ||  || align=right data-sort-value="0.78" | 780 m || 
|-id=421 bgcolor=#fefefe
| 498421 ||  || — || December 30, 2007 || Mount Lemmon || Mount Lemmon Survey ||  || align=right data-sort-value="0.59" | 590 m || 
|-id=422 bgcolor=#FA8072
| 498422 ||  || — || January 10, 2008 || Mount Lemmon || Mount Lemmon Survey ||  || align=right | 1.1 km || 
|-id=423 bgcolor=#fefefe
| 498423 ||  || — || January 10, 2008 || Mount Lemmon || Mount Lemmon Survey ||  || align=right data-sort-value="0.69" | 690 m || 
|-id=424 bgcolor=#d6d6d6
| 498424 ||  || — || December 16, 2007 || Kitt Peak || Spacewatch || THM || align=right | 1.7 km || 
|-id=425 bgcolor=#fefefe
| 498425 ||  || — || December 28, 2007 || Kitt Peak || Spacewatch ||  || align=right data-sort-value="0.67" | 670 m || 
|-id=426 bgcolor=#fefefe
| 498426 ||  || — || December 28, 2007 || Kitt Peak || Spacewatch ||  || align=right data-sort-value="0.49" | 490 m || 
|-id=427 bgcolor=#d6d6d6
| 498427 ||  || — || October 17, 2007 || Mount Lemmon || Mount Lemmon Survey ||  || align=right | 2.2 km || 
|-id=428 bgcolor=#fefefe
| 498428 ||  || — || January 11, 2008 || Kitt Peak || Spacewatch ||  || align=right data-sort-value="0.57" | 570 m || 
|-id=429 bgcolor=#fefefe
| 498429 ||  || — || January 12, 2008 || Kitt Peak || Spacewatch ||  || align=right data-sort-value="0.65" | 650 m || 
|-id=430 bgcolor=#fefefe
| 498430 ||  || — || January 11, 2008 || Kitt Peak || Spacewatch || NYS || align=right data-sort-value="0.53" | 530 m || 
|-id=431 bgcolor=#fefefe
| 498431 ||  || — || January 11, 2008 || Kitt Peak || Spacewatch ||  || align=right data-sort-value="0.59" | 590 m || 
|-id=432 bgcolor=#fefefe
| 498432 ||  || — || January 1, 2008 || Kitt Peak || Spacewatch ||  || align=right data-sort-value="0.91" | 910 m || 
|-id=433 bgcolor=#fefefe
| 498433 ||  || — || January 15, 2008 || Kitt Peak || Spacewatch ||  || align=right data-sort-value="0.67" | 670 m || 
|-id=434 bgcolor=#fefefe
| 498434 ||  || — || December 30, 2007 || Mount Lemmon || Mount Lemmon Survey || H || align=right data-sort-value="0.82" | 820 m || 
|-id=435 bgcolor=#d6d6d6
| 498435 ||  || — || January 1, 2008 || Kitt Peak || Spacewatch ||  || align=right | 2.7 km || 
|-id=436 bgcolor=#fefefe
| 498436 ||  || — || December 18, 2007 || Mount Lemmon || Mount Lemmon Survey || NYS || align=right data-sort-value="0.56" | 560 m || 
|-id=437 bgcolor=#d6d6d6
| 498437 ||  || — || November 18, 2007 || Mount Lemmon || Mount Lemmon Survey ||  || align=right | 2.8 km || 
|-id=438 bgcolor=#fefefe
| 498438 ||  || — || January 15, 2008 || Kitt Peak || Spacewatch ||  || align=right data-sort-value="0.52" | 520 m || 
|-id=439 bgcolor=#fefefe
| 498439 ||  || — || December 14, 2007 || Mount Lemmon || Mount Lemmon Survey ||  || align=right data-sort-value="0.69" | 690 m || 
|-id=440 bgcolor=#d6d6d6
| 498440 ||  || — || January 15, 2008 || Kitt Peak || Spacewatch ||  || align=right | 2.8 km || 
|-id=441 bgcolor=#FFC2E0
| 498441 ||  || — || January 15, 2008 || Kitt Peak || Spacewatch || AMO || align=right data-sort-value="0.77" | 770 m || 
|-id=442 bgcolor=#fefefe
| 498442 ||  || — || January 15, 2008 || Kitt Peak || Spacewatch ||  || align=right data-sort-value="0.76" | 760 m || 
|-id=443 bgcolor=#fefefe
| 498443 ||  || — || January 10, 2008 || Mount Lemmon || Mount Lemmon Survey ||  || align=right data-sort-value="0.65" | 650 m || 
|-id=444 bgcolor=#d6d6d6
| 498444 ||  || — || January 11, 2008 || Mount Lemmon || Mount Lemmon Survey ||  || align=right | 2.8 km || 
|-id=445 bgcolor=#d6d6d6
| 498445 ||  || — || January 12, 2008 || Kitt Peak || Spacewatch || EOS || align=right | 2.7 km || 
|-id=446 bgcolor=#d6d6d6
| 498446 ||  || — || January 1, 2008 || Kitt Peak || Spacewatch || HYG || align=right | 2.6 km || 
|-id=447 bgcolor=#d6d6d6
| 498447 ||  || — || January 13, 2008 || Kitt Peak || Spacewatch ||  || align=right | 2.5 km || 
|-id=448 bgcolor=#d6d6d6
| 498448 ||  || — || January 13, 2008 || Kitt Peak || Spacewatch ||  || align=right | 3.4 km || 
|-id=449 bgcolor=#fefefe
| 498449 ||  || — || January 13, 2008 || Kitt Peak || Spacewatch || H || align=right data-sort-value="0.60" | 600 m || 
|-id=450 bgcolor=#fefefe
| 498450 ||  || — || December 30, 2007 || Mount Lemmon || Mount Lemmon Survey || MAS || align=right data-sort-value="0.59" | 590 m || 
|-id=451 bgcolor=#d6d6d6
| 498451 ||  || — || January 11, 2008 || Mount Lemmon || Mount Lemmon Survey ||  || align=right | 1.9 km || 
|-id=452 bgcolor=#d6d6d6
| 498452 ||  || — || January 30, 2008 || Mount Lemmon || Mount Lemmon Survey || THM || align=right | 1.7 km || 
|-id=453 bgcolor=#fefefe
| 498453 ||  || — || January 30, 2008 || Mount Lemmon || Mount Lemmon Survey || NYS || align=right data-sort-value="0.61" | 610 m || 
|-id=454 bgcolor=#fefefe
| 498454 ||  || — || January 31, 2008 || Mount Lemmon || Mount Lemmon Survey ||  || align=right data-sort-value="0.63" | 630 m || 
|-id=455 bgcolor=#fefefe
| 498455 ||  || — || December 31, 2007 || Mount Lemmon || Mount Lemmon Survey ||  || align=right data-sort-value="0.70" | 700 m || 
|-id=456 bgcolor=#fefefe
| 498456 ||  || — || January 5, 2008 || XuYi || PMO NEO ||  || align=right | 1.1 km || 
|-id=457 bgcolor=#fefefe
| 498457 ||  || — || January 16, 2008 || Kitt Peak || Spacewatch ||  || align=right data-sort-value="0.56" | 560 m || 
|-id=458 bgcolor=#d6d6d6
| 498458 ||  || — || January 19, 2008 || Mount Lemmon || Mount Lemmon Survey || EUP || align=right | 2.7 km || 
|-id=459 bgcolor=#d6d6d6
| 498459 ||  || — || January 30, 2008 || Catalina || CSS || 7:4 || align=right | 3.2 km || 
|-id=460 bgcolor=#fefefe
| 498460 ||  || — || February 2, 2008 || Kitt Peak || Spacewatch || H || align=right data-sort-value="0.54" | 540 m || 
|-id=461 bgcolor=#fefefe
| 498461 ||  || — || January 11, 2008 || Mount Lemmon || Mount Lemmon Survey ||  || align=right data-sort-value="0.65" | 650 m || 
|-id=462 bgcolor=#fefefe
| 498462 ||  || — || February 3, 2008 || Kitt Peak || Spacewatch ||  || align=right data-sort-value="0.64" | 640 m || 
|-id=463 bgcolor=#fefefe
| 498463 ||  || — || February 7, 2008 || Altschwendt || W. Ries ||  || align=right data-sort-value="0.72" | 720 m || 
|-id=464 bgcolor=#fefefe
| 498464 ||  || — || October 14, 2007 || Mount Lemmon || Mount Lemmon Survey ||  || align=right data-sort-value="0.76" | 760 m || 
|-id=465 bgcolor=#fefefe
| 498465 ||  || — || January 10, 2008 || Mount Lemmon || Mount Lemmon Survey ||  || align=right data-sort-value="0.51" | 510 m || 
|-id=466 bgcolor=#fefefe
| 498466 ||  || — || January 19, 2008 || Kitt Peak || Spacewatch ||  || align=right data-sort-value="0.57" | 570 m || 
|-id=467 bgcolor=#fefefe
| 498467 ||  || — || February 2, 2008 || Kitt Peak || Spacewatch ||  || align=right data-sort-value="0.67" | 670 m || 
|-id=468 bgcolor=#fefefe
| 498468 ||  || — || February 2, 2008 || Kitt Peak || Spacewatch ||  || align=right data-sort-value="0.57" | 570 m || 
|-id=469 bgcolor=#fefefe
| 498469 ||  || — || February 2, 2008 || Kitt Peak || Spacewatch ||  || align=right data-sort-value="0.67" | 670 m || 
|-id=470 bgcolor=#fefefe
| 498470 ||  || — || February 6, 2008 || Catalina || CSS || H || align=right data-sort-value="0.73" | 730 m || 
|-id=471 bgcolor=#d6d6d6
| 498471 ||  || — || February 6, 2008 || Purple Mountain || PMO NEO || 7:4 || align=right | 2.9 km || 
|-id=472 bgcolor=#fefefe
| 498472 ||  || — || February 7, 2008 || Mount Lemmon || Mount Lemmon Survey ||  || align=right data-sort-value="0.55" | 550 m || 
|-id=473 bgcolor=#fefefe
| 498473 ||  || — || January 14, 2008 || Kitt Peak || Spacewatch || NYS || align=right data-sort-value="0.74" | 740 m || 
|-id=474 bgcolor=#fefefe
| 498474 ||  || — || February 7, 2008 || Mount Lemmon || Mount Lemmon Survey ||  || align=right data-sort-value="0.74" | 740 m || 
|-id=475 bgcolor=#fefefe
| 498475 ||  || — || February 8, 2008 || Kitt Peak || Spacewatch || H || align=right data-sort-value="0.40" | 400 m || 
|-id=476 bgcolor=#d6d6d6
| 498476 ||  || — || September 11, 2007 || Mount Lemmon || Mount Lemmon Survey || EUP || align=right | 3.1 km || 
|-id=477 bgcolor=#fefefe
| 498477 ||  || — || January 10, 2008 || Mount Lemmon || Mount Lemmon Survey || NYS || align=right data-sort-value="0.52" | 520 m || 
|-id=478 bgcolor=#fefefe
| 498478 ||  || — || November 29, 2003 || Kitt Peak || Spacewatch || NYS || align=right data-sort-value="0.68" | 680 m || 
|-id=479 bgcolor=#fefefe
| 498479 ||  || — || February 7, 2008 || Kitt Peak || Spacewatch ||  || align=right data-sort-value="0.63" | 630 m || 
|-id=480 bgcolor=#fefefe
| 498480 ||  || — || August 29, 2006 || Kitt Peak || Spacewatch || SUL || align=right data-sort-value="0.63" | 630 m || 
|-id=481 bgcolor=#fefefe
| 498481 ||  || — || February 7, 2008 || Mount Lemmon || Mount Lemmon Survey || NYS || align=right data-sort-value="0.70" | 700 m || 
|-id=482 bgcolor=#d6d6d6
| 498482 ||  || — || January 30, 2008 || Mount Lemmon || Mount Lemmon Survey ||  || align=right | 2.3 km || 
|-id=483 bgcolor=#fefefe
| 498483 ||  || — || February 9, 2008 || Mount Lemmon || Mount Lemmon Survey ||  || align=right data-sort-value="0.93" | 930 m || 
|-id=484 bgcolor=#d6d6d6
| 498484 ||  || — || February 9, 2008 || Catalina || CSS || Tj (2.97) || align=right | 3.0 km || 
|-id=485 bgcolor=#fefefe
| 498485 ||  || — || February 10, 2008 || Kitt Peak || Spacewatch || H || align=right data-sort-value="0.75" | 750 m || 
|-id=486 bgcolor=#d6d6d6
| 498486 ||  || — || January 11, 2008 || Mount Lemmon || Mount Lemmon Survey || EUP || align=right | 3.3 km || 
|-id=487 bgcolor=#fefefe
| 498487 ||  || — || February 8, 2008 || Kitt Peak || Spacewatch ||  || align=right data-sort-value="0.72" | 720 m || 
|-id=488 bgcolor=#fefefe
| 498488 ||  || — || January 30, 2008 || Mount Lemmon || Mount Lemmon Survey || NYS || align=right data-sort-value="0.70" | 700 m || 
|-id=489 bgcolor=#fefefe
| 498489 ||  || — || February 8, 2008 || Kitt Peak || Spacewatch || MAS || align=right data-sort-value="0.60" | 600 m || 
|-id=490 bgcolor=#fefefe
| 498490 ||  || — || February 8, 2008 || Mount Lemmon || Mount Lemmon Survey || NYS || align=right data-sort-value="0.60" | 600 m || 
|-id=491 bgcolor=#fefefe
| 498491 ||  || — || November 7, 2007 || Mount Lemmon || Mount Lemmon Survey ||  || align=right data-sort-value="0.73" | 730 m || 
|-id=492 bgcolor=#FA8072
| 498492 ||  || — || January 1, 2008 || Catalina || CSS || H || align=right data-sort-value="0.61" | 610 m || 
|-id=493 bgcolor=#fefefe
| 498493 ||  || — || November 13, 2007 || Mount Lemmon || Mount Lemmon Survey ||  || align=right | 1.1 km || 
|-id=494 bgcolor=#d6d6d6
| 498494 ||  || — || February 10, 2008 || Anderson Mesa || LONEOS ||  || align=right | 4.6 km || 
|-id=495 bgcolor=#d6d6d6
| 498495 ||  || — || February 13, 2008 || Kitt Peak || Spacewatch ||  || align=right | 2.6 km || 
|-id=496 bgcolor=#fefefe
| 498496 ||  || — || February 7, 2008 || Kitt Peak || Spacewatch || LCI || align=right data-sort-value="0.80" | 800 m || 
|-id=497 bgcolor=#fefefe
| 498497 ||  || — || February 12, 2008 || Kitt Peak || Spacewatch || MAS || align=right data-sort-value="0.59" | 590 m || 
|-id=498 bgcolor=#fefefe
| 498498 ||  || — || February 3, 2008 || Kitt Peak || Spacewatch || H || align=right data-sort-value="0.65" | 650 m || 
|-id=499 bgcolor=#fefefe
| 498499 ||  || — || February 7, 2008 || Mount Lemmon || Mount Lemmon Survey ||  || align=right | 1.0 km || 
|-id=500 bgcolor=#fefefe
| 498500 ||  || — || December 1, 2003 || Kitt Peak || Spacewatch ||  || align=right data-sort-value="0.76" | 760 m || 
|}

498501–498600 

|-bgcolor=#fefefe
| 498501 ||  || — || January 30, 2008 || Kitt Peak || Spacewatch ||  || align=right data-sort-value="0.57" | 570 m || 
|-id=502 bgcolor=#fefefe
| 498502 ||  || — || February 24, 2008 || Kitt Peak || Spacewatch ||  || align=right data-sort-value="0.67" | 670 m || 
|-id=503 bgcolor=#d6d6d6
| 498503 ||  || — || February 26, 2008 || Mount Lemmon || Mount Lemmon Survey ||  || align=right | 2.1 km || 
|-id=504 bgcolor=#fefefe
| 498504 ||  || — || February 24, 2008 || Kitt Peak || Spacewatch ||  || align=right data-sort-value="0.66" | 660 m || 
|-id=505 bgcolor=#d6d6d6
| 498505 ||  || — || February 27, 2008 || Kitt Peak || Spacewatch || TIR || align=right | 2.7 km || 
|-id=506 bgcolor=#fefefe
| 498506 ||  || — || February 28, 2008 || Mount Lemmon || Mount Lemmon Survey || NYS || align=right data-sort-value="0.70" | 700 m || 
|-id=507 bgcolor=#fefefe
| 498507 ||  || — || January 10, 2008 || Kitt Peak || Spacewatch || V || align=right data-sort-value="0.49" | 490 m || 
|-id=508 bgcolor=#E9E9E9
| 498508 ||  || — || February 8, 2008 || Kitt Peak || Spacewatch || HNS || align=right | 2.3 km || 
|-id=509 bgcolor=#fefefe
| 498509 ||  || — || February 27, 2008 || Mount Lemmon || Mount Lemmon Survey || NYS || align=right data-sort-value="0.62" | 620 m || 
|-id=510 bgcolor=#fefefe
| 498510 ||  || — || February 7, 2008 || Mount Lemmon || Mount Lemmon Survey ||  || align=right data-sort-value="0.61" | 610 m || 
|-id=511 bgcolor=#d6d6d6
| 498511 ||  || — || November 19, 2007 || Kitt Peak || Spacewatch ||  || align=right | 3.2 km || 
|-id=512 bgcolor=#d6d6d6
| 498512 ||  || — || February 28, 2008 || Mount Lemmon || Mount Lemmon Survey || TIR || align=right | 2.3 km || 
|-id=513 bgcolor=#fefefe
| 498513 ||  || — || February 7, 2008 || Kitt Peak || Spacewatch || MAS || align=right data-sort-value="0.58" | 580 m || 
|-id=514 bgcolor=#fefefe
| 498514 ||  || — || February 27, 2008 || Kitt Peak || Spacewatch ||  || align=right data-sort-value="0.70" | 700 m || 
|-id=515 bgcolor=#d6d6d6
| 498515 ||  || — || January 9, 2008 || Mount Lemmon || Mount Lemmon Survey ||  || align=right | 2.3 km || 
|-id=516 bgcolor=#fefefe
| 498516 ||  || — || March 1, 2008 || Kitt Peak || Spacewatch || SUL || align=right data-sort-value="0.75" | 750 m || 
|-id=517 bgcolor=#E9E9E9
| 498517 ||  || — || February 10, 2008 || Kitt Peak || Spacewatch ||  || align=right data-sort-value="0.74" | 740 m || 
|-id=518 bgcolor=#d6d6d6
| 498518 ||  || — || January 30, 2008 || Mount Lemmon || Mount Lemmon Survey || 7:4 || align=right | 3.6 km || 
|-id=519 bgcolor=#fefefe
| 498519 ||  || — || March 1, 2008 || Kitt Peak || Spacewatch || H || align=right data-sort-value="0.55" | 550 m || 
|-id=520 bgcolor=#d6d6d6
| 498520 ||  || — || February 28, 2008 || Kitt Peak || Spacewatch || EUP || align=right | 3.8 km || 
|-id=521 bgcolor=#fefefe
| 498521 ||  || — || February 7, 2008 || Mount Lemmon || Mount Lemmon Survey || H || align=right data-sort-value="0.56" | 560 m || 
|-id=522 bgcolor=#fefefe
| 498522 ||  || — || February 18, 2008 || Mount Lemmon || Mount Lemmon Survey || H || align=right data-sort-value="0.47" | 470 m || 
|-id=523 bgcolor=#fefefe
| 498523 ||  || — || March 7, 2008 || Kitt Peak || Spacewatch || MAS || align=right data-sort-value="0.56" | 560 m || 
|-id=524 bgcolor=#E9E9E9
| 498524 ||  || — || March 8, 2008 || Kitt Peak || Spacewatch ||  || align=right | 1.3 km || 
|-id=525 bgcolor=#fefefe
| 498525 ||  || — || February 18, 2008 || Mount Lemmon || Mount Lemmon Survey ||  || align=right data-sort-value="0.76" | 760 m || 
|-id=526 bgcolor=#E9E9E9
| 498526 ||  || — || March 10, 2008 || Kitt Peak || Spacewatch || EUN || align=right data-sort-value="0.82" | 820 m || 
|-id=527 bgcolor=#fefefe
| 498527 ||  || — || March 10, 2008 || Kitt Peak || Spacewatch ||  || align=right data-sort-value="0.83" | 830 m || 
|-id=528 bgcolor=#d6d6d6
| 498528 ||  || — || March 9, 2008 || Kitt Peak || Spacewatch || THB || align=right | 2.5 km || 
|-id=529 bgcolor=#fefefe
| 498529 ||  || — || March 5, 2008 || Kitt Peak || Spacewatch ||  || align=right | 1.1 km || 
|-id=530 bgcolor=#fefefe
| 498530 ||  || — || March 28, 2008 || Kitt Peak || Spacewatch ||  || align=right data-sort-value="0.79" | 790 m || 
|-id=531 bgcolor=#fefefe
| 498531 ||  || — || March 30, 2008 || Kitt Peak || Spacewatch || SUL || align=right data-sort-value="0.90" | 900 m || 
|-id=532 bgcolor=#fefefe
| 498532 ||  || — || March 30, 2008 || Kitt Peak || Spacewatch ||  || align=right data-sort-value="0.83" | 830 m || 
|-id=533 bgcolor=#E9E9E9
| 498533 ||  || — || March 31, 2008 || Kitt Peak || Spacewatch ||  || align=right | 1.3 km || 
|-id=534 bgcolor=#E9E9E9
| 498534 ||  || — || March 31, 2008 || Vail-Jarnac || Jarnac Obs. ||  || align=right | 1.7 km || 
|-id=535 bgcolor=#E9E9E9
| 498535 ||  || — || March 29, 2008 || Kitt Peak || Spacewatch ||  || align=right data-sort-value="0.92" | 920 m || 
|-id=536 bgcolor=#C2FFFF
| 498536 ||  || — || March 30, 2008 || Kitt Peak || Spacewatch || L5 || align=right | 7.1 km || 
|-id=537 bgcolor=#d6d6d6
| 498537 ||  || — || March 28, 2008 || Mount Lemmon || Mount Lemmon Survey || 3:2 || align=right | 4.0 km || 
|-id=538 bgcolor=#E9E9E9
| 498538 ||  || — || March 10, 2008 || Mount Lemmon || Mount Lemmon Survey ||  || align=right | 1.0 km || 
|-id=539 bgcolor=#fefefe
| 498539 ||  || — || April 1, 2008 || Mount Lemmon || Mount Lemmon Survey ||  || align=right data-sort-value="0.55" | 550 m || 
|-id=540 bgcolor=#fefefe
| 498540 ||  || — || April 3, 2008 || Kitt Peak || Spacewatch || H || align=right data-sort-value="0.71" | 710 m || 
|-id=541 bgcolor=#FA8072
| 498541 ||  || — || March 10, 2008 || Mount Lemmon || Mount Lemmon Survey ||  || align=right data-sort-value="0.52" | 520 m || 
|-id=542 bgcolor=#E9E9E9
| 498542 ||  || — || April 3, 2008 || Kitt Peak || Spacewatch ||  || align=right data-sort-value="0.81" | 810 m || 
|-id=543 bgcolor=#E9E9E9
| 498543 ||  || — || April 3, 2008 || Kitt Peak || Spacewatch ||  || align=right data-sort-value="0.76" | 760 m || 
|-id=544 bgcolor=#E9E9E9
| 498544 ||  || — || April 4, 2008 || Kitt Peak || Spacewatch ||  || align=right | 1.3 km || 
|-id=545 bgcolor=#E9E9E9
| 498545 ||  || — || March 28, 2008 || Mount Lemmon || Mount Lemmon Survey ||  || align=right data-sort-value="0.62" | 620 m || 
|-id=546 bgcolor=#E9E9E9
| 498546 ||  || — || April 6, 2008 || Mount Lemmon || Mount Lemmon Survey ||  || align=right | 2.0 km || 
|-id=547 bgcolor=#fefefe
| 498547 ||  || — || April 6, 2008 || Mount Lemmon || Mount Lemmon Survey ||  || align=right data-sort-value="0.65" | 650 m || 
|-id=548 bgcolor=#FFC2E0
| 498548 ||  || — || April 14, 2008 || Mount Lemmon || Mount Lemmon Survey || APO || align=right data-sort-value="0.36" | 360 m || 
|-id=549 bgcolor=#E9E9E9
| 498549 ||  || — || April 11, 2008 || Kitt Peak || Spacewatch ||  || align=right | 1.1 km || 
|-id=550 bgcolor=#FFC2E0
| 498550 ||  || — || April 30, 2008 || Mount Lemmon || Mount Lemmon Survey || AMO || align=right data-sort-value="0.42" | 420 m || 
|-id=551 bgcolor=#E9E9E9
| 498551 ||  || — || April 24, 2008 || Kitt Peak || Spacewatch ||  || align=right | 1.5 km || 
|-id=552 bgcolor=#fefefe
| 498552 ||  || — || March 5, 2008 || Kitt Peak || Spacewatch || MAS || align=right data-sort-value="0.68" | 680 m || 
|-id=553 bgcolor=#fefefe
| 498553 ||  || — || April 25, 2008 || Mount Lemmon || Mount Lemmon Survey || NYS || align=right data-sort-value="0.57" | 570 m || 
|-id=554 bgcolor=#E9E9E9
| 498554 ||  || — || April 25, 2008 || Kitt Peak || Spacewatch ||  || align=right | 1.0 km || 
|-id=555 bgcolor=#E9E9E9
| 498555 ||  || — || April 15, 2008 || Mount Lemmon || Mount Lemmon Survey ||  || align=right | 1.6 km || 
|-id=556 bgcolor=#E9E9E9
| 498556 ||  || — || April 28, 2008 || Kitt Peak || Spacewatch ||  || align=right | 1.2 km || 
|-id=557 bgcolor=#E9E9E9
| 498557 ||  || — || April 28, 2008 || Kitt Peak || Spacewatch ||  || align=right | 1.7 km || 
|-id=558 bgcolor=#E9E9E9
| 498558 ||  || — || April 15, 2008 || Mount Lemmon || Mount Lemmon Survey ||  || align=right | 1.3 km || 
|-id=559 bgcolor=#E9E9E9
| 498559 ||  || — || April 15, 2008 || Kitt Peak || Spacewatch ||  || align=right data-sort-value="0.79" | 790 m || 
|-id=560 bgcolor=#E9E9E9
| 498560 ||  || — || April 25, 2008 || Kitt Peak || Spacewatch ||  || align=right | 1.1 km || 
|-id=561 bgcolor=#E9E9E9
| 498561 ||  || — || April 13, 2008 || Mount Lemmon || Mount Lemmon Survey ||  || align=right data-sort-value="0.85" | 850 m || 
|-id=562 bgcolor=#E9E9E9
| 498562 ||  || — || May 8, 2008 || Kitt Peak || Spacewatch ||  || align=right data-sort-value="0.94" | 940 m || 
|-id=563 bgcolor=#E9E9E9
| 498563 ||  || — || May 26, 2008 || Kitt Peak || Spacewatch || JUN || align=right data-sort-value="0.97" | 970 m || 
|-id=564 bgcolor=#E9E9E9
| 498564 ||  || — || May 28, 2008 || Kitt Peak || Spacewatch ||  || align=right | 1.1 km || 
|-id=565 bgcolor=#E9E9E9
| 498565 ||  || — || April 29, 2008 || Kitt Peak || Spacewatch ||  || align=right | 1.1 km || 
|-id=566 bgcolor=#E9E9E9
| 498566 ||  || — || May 8, 2008 || Kitt Peak || Spacewatch ||  || align=right data-sort-value="0.74" | 740 m || 
|-id=567 bgcolor=#E9E9E9
| 498567 ||  || — || May 11, 2008 || Mount Lemmon || Mount Lemmon Survey || EUN || align=right | 1.1 km || 
|-id=568 bgcolor=#E9E9E9
| 498568 ||  || — || May 3, 2008 || Kitt Peak || Spacewatch ||  || align=right | 1.1 km || 
|-id=569 bgcolor=#E9E9E9
| 498569 ||  || — || April 8, 2008 || Kitt Peak || Spacewatch ||  || align=right data-sort-value="0.93" | 930 m || 
|-id=570 bgcolor=#E9E9E9
| 498570 ||  || — || May 3, 2008 || Kitt Peak || Spacewatch ||  || align=right | 1.2 km || 
|-id=571 bgcolor=#E9E9E9
| 498571 ||  || — || May 5, 2008 || Mount Lemmon || Mount Lemmon Survey ||  || align=right | 1.3 km || 
|-id=572 bgcolor=#E9E9E9
| 498572 ||  || — || June 3, 2008 || Kitt Peak || Spacewatch || MAR || align=right data-sort-value="0.87" | 870 m || 
|-id=573 bgcolor=#E9E9E9
| 498573 ||  || — || May 29, 2008 || Kitt Peak || Spacewatch ||  || align=right data-sort-value="0.80" | 800 m || 
|-id=574 bgcolor=#E9E9E9
| 498574 ||  || — || January 10, 2007 || Kitt Peak || Spacewatch ||  || align=right | 1.1 km || 
|-id=575 bgcolor=#E9E9E9
| 498575 ||  || — || May 27, 2008 || Kitt Peak || Spacewatch ||  || align=right data-sort-value="0.87" | 870 m || 
|-id=576 bgcolor=#E9E9E9
| 498576 ||  || — || May 14, 2008 || Mount Lemmon || Mount Lemmon Survey ||  || align=right | 1.6 km || 
|-id=577 bgcolor=#E9E9E9
| 498577 ||  || — || June 9, 2008 || Kitt Peak || Spacewatch ||  || align=right | 1.6 km || 
|-id=578 bgcolor=#E9E9E9
| 498578 ||  || — || July 5, 2008 || La Sagra || OAM Obs. ||  || align=right | 3.7 km || 
|-id=579 bgcolor=#E9E9E9
| 498579 ||  || — || July 26, 2008 || La Sagra || OAM Obs. || BRU || align=right | 4.6 km || 
|-id=580 bgcolor=#E9E9E9
| 498580 ||  || — || July 26, 2008 || Siding Spring || SSS ||  || align=right | 3.2 km || 
|-id=581 bgcolor=#E9E9E9
| 498581 ||  || — || August 13, 2008 || La Sagra || OAM Obs. ||  || align=right | 3.7 km || 
|-id=582 bgcolor=#E9E9E9
| 498582 ||  || — || August 24, 2008 || La Sagra || OAM Obs. ||  || align=right | 1.4 km || 
|-id=583 bgcolor=#E9E9E9
| 498583 ||  || — || August 26, 2008 || La Sagra || OAM Obs. ||  || align=right | 2.0 km || 
|-id=584 bgcolor=#E9E9E9
| 498584 ||  || — || July 29, 2008 || Kitt Peak || Spacewatch ||  || align=right | 1.1 km || 
|-id=585 bgcolor=#E9E9E9
| 498585 ||  || — || August 26, 2008 || La Sagra || OAM Obs. ||  || align=right | 3.5 km || 
|-id=586 bgcolor=#E9E9E9
| 498586 ||  || — || August 12, 2008 || La Sagra || OAM Obs. ||  || align=right | 1.5 km || 
|-id=587 bgcolor=#E9E9E9
| 498587 ||  || — || August 25, 2008 || La Sagra || OAM Obs. || EUN || align=right | 1.5 km || 
|-id=588 bgcolor=#E9E9E9
| 498588 ||  || — || August 24, 2008 || La Sagra || OAM Obs. ||  || align=right | 2.4 km || 
|-id=589 bgcolor=#E9E9E9
| 498589 ||  || — || August 7, 2008 || Kitt Peak || Spacewatch ||  || align=right | 2.2 km || 
|-id=590 bgcolor=#E9E9E9
| 498590 ||  || — || August 23, 2008 || Kitt Peak || Spacewatch ||  || align=right | 1.2 km || 
|-id=591 bgcolor=#E9E9E9
| 498591 ||  || — || August 29, 2008 || La Sagra || OAM Obs. ||  || align=right | 2.4 km || 
|-id=592 bgcolor=#E9E9E9
| 498592 ||  || — || August 26, 2008 || La Sagra || OAM Obs. ||  || align=right | 2.7 km || 
|-id=593 bgcolor=#E9E9E9
| 498593 ||  || — || August 30, 2008 || Socorro || LINEAR ||  || align=right | 2.1 km || 
|-id=594 bgcolor=#E9E9E9
| 498594 ||  || — || August 24, 2008 || Socorro || LINEAR || GAL || align=right | 1.6 km || 
|-id=595 bgcolor=#E9E9E9
| 498595 ||  || — || August 2, 2008 || Siding Spring || SSS ||  || align=right | 1.4 km || 
|-id=596 bgcolor=#E9E9E9
| 498596 ||  || — || September 3, 2008 || Kitt Peak || Spacewatch || DOR || align=right | 2.0 km || 
|-id=597 bgcolor=#E9E9E9
| 498597 ||  || — || September 2, 2008 || Kitt Peak || Spacewatch ||  || align=right | 1.5 km || 
|-id=598 bgcolor=#E9E9E9
| 498598 ||  || — || September 2, 2008 || Kitt Peak || Spacewatch || MRX || align=right data-sort-value="0.87" | 870 m || 
|-id=599 bgcolor=#E9E9E9
| 498599 ||  || — || September 2, 2008 || Kitt Peak || Spacewatch ||  || align=right | 2.1 km || 
|-id=600 bgcolor=#E9E9E9
| 498600 ||  || — || September 2, 2008 || Kitt Peak || Spacewatch || AGN || align=right data-sort-value="0.98" | 980 m || 
|}

498601–498700 

|-bgcolor=#E9E9E9
| 498601 ||  || — || September 2, 2008 || Kitt Peak || Spacewatch || HOF || align=right | 2.0 km || 
|-id=602 bgcolor=#E9E9E9
| 498602 ||  || — || September 2, 2008 || Kitt Peak || Spacewatch ||  || align=right | 1.9 km || 
|-id=603 bgcolor=#E9E9E9
| 498603 ||  || — || September 2, 2008 || Kitt Peak || Spacewatch || HOF || align=right | 2.2 km || 
|-id=604 bgcolor=#E9E9E9
| 498604 ||  || — || September 2, 2008 || Kitt Peak || Spacewatch ||  || align=right | 1.6 km || 
|-id=605 bgcolor=#E9E9E9
| 498605 ||  || — || August 2, 2008 || La Sagra || OAM Obs. ||  || align=right | 2.3 km || 
|-id=606 bgcolor=#E9E9E9
| 498606 ||  || — || September 3, 2008 || Kitt Peak || Spacewatch ||  || align=right | 1.7 km || 
|-id=607 bgcolor=#E9E9E9
| 498607 ||  || — || September 4, 2008 || Kitt Peak || Spacewatch || GEF || align=right | 1.9 km || 
|-id=608 bgcolor=#E9E9E9
| 498608 ||  || — || September 7, 2008 || Mount Lemmon || Mount Lemmon Survey ||  || align=right | 2.2 km || 
|-id=609 bgcolor=#E9E9E9
| 498609 ||  || — || September 4, 2008 || Kitt Peak || Spacewatch || AGN || align=right | 2.7 km || 
|-id=610 bgcolor=#E9E9E9
| 498610 ||  || — || September 5, 2008 || Kitt Peak || Spacewatch ||  || align=right | 1.4 km || 
|-id=611 bgcolor=#E9E9E9
| 498611 ||  || — || September 4, 2008 || Kitt Peak || Spacewatch ||  || align=right | 1.2 km || 
|-id=612 bgcolor=#E9E9E9
| 498612 ||  || — || September 7, 2008 || Mount Lemmon || Mount Lemmon Survey || NEM || align=right | 1.8 km || 
|-id=613 bgcolor=#E9E9E9
| 498613 ||  || — || September 5, 2008 || Kitt Peak || Spacewatch ||  || align=right | 2.0 km || 
|-id=614 bgcolor=#E9E9E9
| 498614 ||  || — || September 2, 2008 || Kitt Peak || Spacewatch ||  || align=right | 1.2 km || 
|-id=615 bgcolor=#E9E9E9
| 498615 ||  || — || September 3, 2008 || Kitt Peak || Spacewatch ||  || align=right | 1.6 km || 
|-id=616 bgcolor=#C2FFFF
| 498616 ||  || — || September 5, 2008 || Kitt Peak || Spacewatch || L4 || align=right | 6.8 km || 
|-id=617 bgcolor=#E9E9E9
| 498617 ||  || — || September 9, 2008 || Kitt Peak || Spacewatch || WIT || align=right | 2.1 km || 
|-id=618 bgcolor=#E9E9E9
| 498618 ||  || — || September 9, 2008 || Mount Lemmon || Mount Lemmon Survey || CLO || align=right | 2.1 km || 
|-id=619 bgcolor=#E9E9E9
| 498619 ||  || — || September 3, 2008 || Kitt Peak || Spacewatch || AGN || align=right | 2.0 km || 
|-id=620 bgcolor=#d6d6d6
| 498620 ||  || — || September 3, 2008 || Kitt Peak || Spacewatch ||  || align=right | 1.9 km || 
|-id=621 bgcolor=#d6d6d6
| 498621 ||  || — || September 3, 2008 || Kitt Peak || Spacewatch || KOR || align=right | 1.2 km || 
|-id=622 bgcolor=#E9E9E9
| 498622 ||  || — || September 7, 2008 || Catalina || CSS ||  || align=right | 2.3 km || 
|-id=623 bgcolor=#E9E9E9
| 498623 ||  || — || September 9, 2008 || Kitt Peak || Spacewatch ||  || align=right | 2.1 km || 
|-id=624 bgcolor=#E9E9E9
| 498624 ||  || — || September 9, 2008 || Kitt Peak || Spacewatch ||  || align=right | 2.2 km || 
|-id=625 bgcolor=#E9E9E9
| 498625 ||  || — || September 2, 2008 || Kitt Peak || Spacewatch || HOF || align=right | 2.7 km || 
|-id=626 bgcolor=#E9E9E9
| 498626 ||  || — || September 4, 2008 || Kitt Peak || Spacewatch ||  || align=right | 2.2 km || 
|-id=627 bgcolor=#E9E9E9
| 498627 ||  || — || September 9, 2008 || Mount Lemmon || Mount Lemmon Survey ||  || align=right | 1.7 km || 
|-id=628 bgcolor=#E9E9E9
| 498628 ||  || — || September 7, 2008 || Mount Lemmon || Mount Lemmon Survey || HNS || align=right | 1.7 km || 
|-id=629 bgcolor=#E9E9E9
| 498629 ||  || — || September 10, 2008 || Charleston || ARO ||  || align=right | 3.1 km || 
|-id=630 bgcolor=#E9E9E9
| 498630 ||  || — || September 6, 2008 || Catalina || CSS || JUN || align=right | 1.0 km || 
|-id=631 bgcolor=#E9E9E9
| 498631 ||  || — || September 4, 2008 || Kitt Peak || Spacewatch ||  || align=right | 1.8 km || 
|-id=632 bgcolor=#E9E9E9
| 498632 ||  || — || September 2, 2008 || Kitt Peak || Spacewatch ||  || align=right | 1.8 km || 
|-id=633 bgcolor=#E9E9E9
| 498633 ||  || — || September 2, 2008 || Kitt Peak || Spacewatch ||  || align=right | 2.0 km || 
|-id=634 bgcolor=#E9E9E9
| 498634 ||  || — || September 7, 2008 || Catalina || CSS ||  || align=right | 1.8 km || 
|-id=635 bgcolor=#E9E9E9
| 498635 ||  || — || September 5, 2008 || Socorro || LINEAR ||  || align=right | 2.2 km || 
|-id=636 bgcolor=#E9E9E9
| 498636 ||  || — || September 2, 2008 || Kitt Peak || Spacewatch ||  || align=right | 1.8 km || 
|-id=637 bgcolor=#E9E9E9
| 498637 ||  || — || September 6, 2008 || Kitt Peak || Spacewatch ||  || align=right | 2.5 km || 
|-id=638 bgcolor=#E9E9E9
| 498638 ||  || — || September 5, 2008 || Kitt Peak || Spacewatch ||  || align=right | 1.5 km || 
|-id=639 bgcolor=#E9E9E9
| 498639 ||  || — || August 28, 2008 || La Sagra || OAM Obs. ||  || align=right | 2.2 km || 
|-id=640 bgcolor=#E9E9E9
| 498640 ||  || — || September 19, 2008 || Kitt Peak || Spacewatch ||  || align=right | 2.5 km || 
|-id=641 bgcolor=#E9E9E9
| 498641 ||  || — || September 20, 2008 || Kitt Peak || Spacewatch ||  || align=right | 3.0 km || 
|-id=642 bgcolor=#E9E9E9
| 498642 ||  || — || July 29, 2008 || Kitt Peak || Spacewatch || NEM || align=right | 1.8 km || 
|-id=643 bgcolor=#E9E9E9
| 498643 ||  || — || September 20, 2008 || Mount Lemmon || Mount Lemmon Survey ||  || align=right | 1.1 km || 
|-id=644 bgcolor=#E9E9E9
| 498644 ||  || — || September 20, 2008 || Kitt Peak || Spacewatch ||  || align=right | 3.8 km || 
|-id=645 bgcolor=#E9E9E9
| 498645 ||  || — || September 9, 2008 || Mount Lemmon || Mount Lemmon Survey || GEF || align=right | 1.2 km || 
|-id=646 bgcolor=#E9E9E9
| 498646 ||  || — || September 20, 2008 || Mount Lemmon || Mount Lemmon Survey || AGN || align=right | 1.1 km || 
|-id=647 bgcolor=#E9E9E9
| 498647 ||  || — || September 21, 2008 || Kitt Peak || Spacewatch || HOF || align=right | 2.5 km || 
|-id=648 bgcolor=#E9E9E9
| 498648 ||  || — || September 21, 2008 || Kitt Peak || Spacewatch || HOF || align=right | 1.9 km || 
|-id=649 bgcolor=#E9E9E9
| 498649 ||  || — || September 23, 2008 || Mount Lemmon || Mount Lemmon Survey || HOF || align=right | 1.9 km || 
|-id=650 bgcolor=#E9E9E9
| 498650 ||  || — || September 20, 2008 || Mount Lemmon || Mount Lemmon Survey || 526 || align=right | 2.2 km || 
|-id=651 bgcolor=#E9E9E9
| 498651 ||  || — || September 5, 2008 || Kitt Peak || Spacewatch ||  || align=right | 1.7 km || 
|-id=652 bgcolor=#E9E9E9
| 498652 ||  || — || September 5, 2008 || Kitt Peak || Spacewatch || NEM || align=right | 1.9 km || 
|-id=653 bgcolor=#E9E9E9
| 498653 ||  || — || September 21, 2008 || Kitt Peak || Spacewatch || MRX || align=right | 2.0 km || 
|-id=654 bgcolor=#E9E9E9
| 498654 ||  || — || September 21, 2008 || Kitt Peak || Spacewatch ||  || align=right | 2.2 km || 
|-id=655 bgcolor=#E9E9E9
| 498655 ||  || — || September 21, 2008 || Kitt Peak || Spacewatch || NEM || align=right | 2.2 km || 
|-id=656 bgcolor=#E9E9E9
| 498656 ||  || — || September 21, 2008 || Kitt Peak || Spacewatch ||  || align=right | 2.0 km || 
|-id=657 bgcolor=#E9E9E9
| 498657 ||  || — || September 22, 2008 || Kitt Peak || Spacewatch || WIT || align=right | 2.0 km || 
|-id=658 bgcolor=#E9E9E9
| 498658 ||  || — || March 4, 2006 || Kitt Peak || Spacewatch || HNS || align=right | 1.1 km || 
|-id=659 bgcolor=#E9E9E9
| 498659 ||  || — || September 22, 2008 || Mount Lemmon || Mount Lemmon Survey ||  || align=right | 1.9 km || 
|-id=660 bgcolor=#E9E9E9
| 498660 ||  || — || September 22, 2008 || Kitt Peak || Spacewatch || WIT || align=right | 2.2 km || 
|-id=661 bgcolor=#E9E9E9
| 498661 ||  || — || September 22, 2008 || Kitt Peak || Spacewatch || AGN || align=right data-sort-value="0.88" | 880 m || 
|-id=662 bgcolor=#E9E9E9
| 498662 ||  || — || September 22, 2008 || Catalina || CSS ||  || align=right | 2.7 km || 
|-id=663 bgcolor=#E9E9E9
| 498663 ||  || — || September 22, 2008 || Kitt Peak || Spacewatch || WIT || align=right | 2.3 km || 
|-id=664 bgcolor=#FA8072
| 498664 ||  || — || September 23, 2008 || Catalina || CSS ||  || align=right | 1.5 km || 
|-id=665 bgcolor=#E9E9E9
| 498665 ||  || — || September 23, 2008 || Kitt Peak || Spacewatch || AGN || align=right | 2.1 km || 
|-id=666 bgcolor=#d6d6d6
| 498666 ||  || — || September 16, 2003 || Kitt Peak || Spacewatch ||  || align=right | 2.1 km || 
|-id=667 bgcolor=#E9E9E9
| 498667 ||  || — || September 24, 2008 || Mount Lemmon || Mount Lemmon Survey ||  || align=right | 2.0 km || 
|-id=668 bgcolor=#E9E9E9
| 498668 ||  || — || September 3, 2008 || Kitt Peak || Spacewatch || MRX || align=right | 1.0 km || 
|-id=669 bgcolor=#E9E9E9
| 498669 ||  || — || September 3, 2008 || Kitt Peak || Spacewatch ||  || align=right | 2.7 km || 
|-id=670 bgcolor=#d6d6d6
| 498670 ||  || — || August 24, 2008 || Kitt Peak || Spacewatch ||  || align=right | 2.1 km || 
|-id=671 bgcolor=#E9E9E9
| 498671 ||  || — || September 5, 2008 || Kitt Peak || Spacewatch ||  || align=right | 1.7 km || 
|-id=672 bgcolor=#E9E9E9
| 498672 ||  || — || September 22, 2008 || Kitt Peak || Spacewatch ||  || align=right | 2.2 km || 
|-id=673 bgcolor=#d6d6d6
| 498673 ||  || — || September 24, 2008 || Mount Lemmon || Mount Lemmon Survey || KOR  KAR || align=right | 1.2 km || 
|-id=674 bgcolor=#E9E9E9
| 498674 ||  || — || September 24, 2008 || Kitt Peak || Spacewatch ||  || align=right | 3.2 km || 
|-id=675 bgcolor=#E9E9E9
| 498675 ||  || — || September 25, 2008 || Kitt Peak || Spacewatch ||  || align=right | 2.4 km || 
|-id=676 bgcolor=#E9E9E9
| 498676 ||  || — || September 25, 2008 || Kitt Peak || Spacewatch || AGN || align=right data-sort-value="0.86" | 860 m || 
|-id=677 bgcolor=#FA8072
| 498677 ||  || — || September 27, 2008 || Catalina || CSS ||  || align=right | 1.8 km || 
|-id=678 bgcolor=#E9E9E9
| 498678 ||  || — || September 25, 2008 || Mount Lemmon || Mount Lemmon Survey ||  || align=right | 1.8 km || 
|-id=679 bgcolor=#E9E9E9
| 498679 ||  || — || September 5, 2008 || Kitt Peak || Spacewatch ||  || align=right | 1.7 km || 
|-id=680 bgcolor=#E9E9E9
| 498680 ||  || — || September 29, 2008 || Kitt Peak || Spacewatch ||  || align=right | 2.5 km || 
|-id=681 bgcolor=#E9E9E9
| 498681 ||  || — || September 29, 2008 || Kitt Peak || Spacewatch ||  || align=right | 2.0 km || 
|-id=682 bgcolor=#E9E9E9
| 498682 ||  || — || September 23, 2008 || Kitt Peak || Spacewatch || AGN || align=right | 1.0 km || 
|-id=683 bgcolor=#E9E9E9
| 498683 ||  || — || September 20, 2008 || Kitt Peak || Spacewatch || MRX || align=right | 2.1 km || 
|-id=684 bgcolor=#E9E9E9
| 498684 ||  || — || September 23, 2008 || Kitt Peak || Spacewatch ||  || align=right | 1.8 km || 
|-id=685 bgcolor=#E9E9E9
| 498685 ||  || — || September 24, 2008 || Kitt Peak || Spacewatch ||  || align=right | 1.8 km || 
|-id=686 bgcolor=#d6d6d6
| 498686 ||  || — || September 23, 2008 || Mount Lemmon || Mount Lemmon Survey || KOR || align=right | 1.1 km || 
|-id=687 bgcolor=#E9E9E9
| 498687 ||  || — || September 25, 2008 || Mount Lemmon || Mount Lemmon Survey ||  || align=right | 2.0 km || 
|-id=688 bgcolor=#E9E9E9
| 498688 ||  || — || September 26, 2008 || Kitt Peak || Spacewatch ||  || align=right | 1.5 km || 
|-id=689 bgcolor=#E9E9E9
| 498689 ||  || — || September 24, 2008 || Mount Lemmon || Mount Lemmon Survey || HOF || align=right | 3.1 km || 
|-id=690 bgcolor=#E9E9E9
| 498690 ||  || — || September 23, 2008 || Kitt Peak || Spacewatch || AGN || align=right data-sort-value="0.92" | 920 m || 
|-id=691 bgcolor=#C2FFFF
| 498691 ||  || — || September 23, 2008 || Mount Lemmon || Mount Lemmon Survey || L4 || align=right | 6.4 km || 
|-id=692 bgcolor=#E9E9E9
| 498692 ||  || — || September 24, 2008 || Kitt Peak || Spacewatch ||  || align=right | 2.1 km || 
|-id=693 bgcolor=#E9E9E9
| 498693 ||  || — || September 21, 2008 || Mount Lemmon || Mount Lemmon Survey ||  || align=right | 2.7 km || 
|-id=694 bgcolor=#E9E9E9
| 498694 ||  || — || September 23, 2008 || Mount Lemmon || Mount Lemmon Survey ||  || align=right | 1.6 km || 
|-id=695 bgcolor=#E9E9E9
| 498695 ||  || — || September 23, 2008 || Kitt Peak || Spacewatch ||  || align=right | 2.6 km || 
|-id=696 bgcolor=#E9E9E9
| 498696 ||  || — || September 29, 2008 || Socorro || LINEAR ||  || align=right | 2.1 km || 
|-id=697 bgcolor=#E9E9E9
| 498697 ||  || — || September 29, 2008 || Socorro || LINEAR ||  || align=right | 2.5 km || 
|-id=698 bgcolor=#E9E9E9
| 498698 ||  || — || September 29, 2008 || Catalina || CSS || DOR || align=right | 2.0 km || 
|-id=699 bgcolor=#d6d6d6
| 498699 ||  || — || September 24, 2008 || Kitt Peak || Spacewatch ||  || align=right | 3.5 km || 
|-id=700 bgcolor=#E9E9E9
| 498700 ||  || — || October 1, 2008 || Hibiscus || S. F. Hönig, N. Teamo || DOR || align=right | 2.3 km || 
|}

498701–498800 

|-bgcolor=#E9E9E9
| 498701 ||  || — || October 1, 2008 || Mount Lemmon || Mount Lemmon Survey ||  || align=right | 1.9 km || 
|-id=702 bgcolor=#d6d6d6
| 498702 ||  || — || October 1, 2008 || Mount Lemmon || Mount Lemmon Survey || EOS || align=right | 1.6 km || 
|-id=703 bgcolor=#E9E9E9
| 498703 ||  || — || September 7, 2008 || Catalina || CSS ||  || align=right | 2.1 km || 
|-id=704 bgcolor=#fefefe
| 498704 ||  || — || October 1, 2008 || Mount Lemmon || Mount Lemmon Survey ||  || align=right data-sort-value="0.47" | 470 m || 
|-id=705 bgcolor=#E9E9E9
| 498705 ||  || — || September 5, 2008 || Kitt Peak || Spacewatch || MRX || align=right | 2.1 km || 
|-id=706 bgcolor=#E9E9E9
| 498706 ||  || — || September 3, 2008 || Kitt Peak || Spacewatch ||  || align=right | 1.6 km || 
|-id=707 bgcolor=#d6d6d6
| 498707 ||  || — || September 26, 2008 || Kitt Peak || Spacewatch || KOR || align=right | 1.0 km || 
|-id=708 bgcolor=#E9E9E9
| 498708 ||  || — || September 3, 2008 || Kitt Peak || Spacewatch || GEF || align=right | 2.1 km || 
|-id=709 bgcolor=#E9E9E9
| 498709 ||  || — || October 2, 2008 || Kitt Peak || Spacewatch || WIT || align=right | 1.6 km || 
|-id=710 bgcolor=#E9E9E9
| 498710 ||  || — || September 25, 2008 || Kitt Peak || Spacewatch ||  || align=right | 1.9 km || 
|-id=711 bgcolor=#E9E9E9
| 498711 ||  || — || September 7, 2008 || Mount Lemmon || Mount Lemmon Survey ||  || align=right | 2.0 km || 
|-id=712 bgcolor=#d6d6d6
| 498712 ||  || — || September 21, 2008 || Kitt Peak || Spacewatch ||  || align=right | 2.2 km || 
|-id=713 bgcolor=#fefefe
| 498713 ||  || — || October 3, 2008 || Kitt Peak || Spacewatch ||  || align=right data-sort-value="0.49" | 490 m || 
|-id=714 bgcolor=#E9E9E9
| 498714 ||  || — || September 3, 2008 || Kitt Peak || Spacewatch || MAR || align=right | 1.6 km || 
|-id=715 bgcolor=#E9E9E9
| 498715 ||  || — || September 26, 2008 || Kitt Peak || Spacewatch ||  || align=right | 1.8 km || 
|-id=716 bgcolor=#E9E9E9
| 498716 ||  || — || October 6, 2008 || Kitt Peak || Spacewatch ||  || align=right | 1.9 km || 
|-id=717 bgcolor=#E9E9E9
| 498717 ||  || — || January 30, 2006 || Kitt Peak || Spacewatch ||  || align=right | 1.8 km || 
|-id=718 bgcolor=#E9E9E9
| 498718 ||  || — || September 9, 2008 || Mount Lemmon || Mount Lemmon Survey ||  || align=right | 1.7 km || 
|-id=719 bgcolor=#E9E9E9
| 498719 ||  || — || October 6, 2008 || Mount Lemmon || Mount Lemmon Survey || AGN || align=right | 1.1 km || 
|-id=720 bgcolor=#E9E9E9
| 498720 ||  || — || October 6, 2008 || Mount Lemmon || Mount Lemmon Survey ||  || align=right | 1.8 km || 
|-id=721 bgcolor=#E9E9E9
| 498721 ||  || — || September 23, 2008 || Mount Lemmon || Mount Lemmon Survey || HNA || align=right | 2.0 km || 
|-id=722 bgcolor=#E9E9E9
| 498722 ||  || — || September 23, 2008 || Catalina || CSS ||  || align=right | 1.9 km || 
|-id=723 bgcolor=#d6d6d6
| 498723 ||  || — || October 6, 2008 || Kitt Peak || Spacewatch || KOR || align=right | 1.3 km || 
|-id=724 bgcolor=#E9E9E9
| 498724 ||  || — || September 27, 2008 || Mount Lemmon || Mount Lemmon Survey || HOF || align=right | 2.2 km || 
|-id=725 bgcolor=#E9E9E9
| 498725 ||  || — || October 6, 2008 || Catalina || CSS ||  || align=right | 2.2 km || 
|-id=726 bgcolor=#E9E9E9
| 498726 ||  || — || October 6, 2008 || Catalina || CSS ||  || align=right | 2.0 km || 
|-id=727 bgcolor=#E9E9E9
| 498727 ||  || — || September 5, 2008 || Kitt Peak || Spacewatch ||  || align=right | 1.7 km || 
|-id=728 bgcolor=#E9E9E9
| 498728 ||  || — || October 7, 2008 || Kitt Peak || Spacewatch || PAD  WIT || align=right | 1.7 km || 
|-id=729 bgcolor=#E9E9E9
| 498729 ||  || — || September 23, 2008 || Kitt Peak || Spacewatch || HOF || align=right | 2.6 km || 
|-id=730 bgcolor=#E9E9E9
| 498730 ||  || — || October 8, 2008 || Mount Lemmon || Mount Lemmon Survey ||  || align=right | 1.9 km || 
|-id=731 bgcolor=#E9E9E9
| 498731 ||  || — || September 23, 2008 || Kitt Peak || Spacewatch ||  || align=right | 1.9 km || 
|-id=732 bgcolor=#E9E9E9
| 498732 ||  || — || October 8, 2008 || Kitt Peak || Spacewatch ||  || align=right | 1.8 km || 
|-id=733 bgcolor=#d6d6d6
| 498733 ||  || — || October 1, 2008 || Kitt Peak || Spacewatch || KOR || align=right | 1.2 km || 
|-id=734 bgcolor=#E9E9E9
| 498734 ||  || — || October 8, 2008 || Mount Lemmon || Mount Lemmon Survey ||  || align=right | 2.0 km || 
|-id=735 bgcolor=#E9E9E9
| 498735 ||  || — || September 23, 2008 || Kitt Peak || Spacewatch || AGN || align=right | 1.2 km || 
|-id=736 bgcolor=#E9E9E9
| 498736 ||  || — || September 29, 2008 || Catalina || CSS ||  || align=right | 2.1 km || 
|-id=737 bgcolor=#E9E9E9
| 498737 ||  || — || October 9, 2008 || Mount Lemmon || Mount Lemmon Survey || HOF || align=right | 1.9 km || 
|-id=738 bgcolor=#E9E9E9
| 498738 ||  || — || September 3, 2008 || Kitt Peak || Spacewatch ||  || align=right | 2.0 km || 
|-id=739 bgcolor=#E9E9E9
| 498739 ||  || — || September 29, 2008 || Catalina || CSS ||  || align=right | 1.6 km || 
|-id=740 bgcolor=#d6d6d6
| 498740 ||  || — || October 1, 2008 || Mount Lemmon || Mount Lemmon Survey || KOR || align=right | 1.0 km || 
|-id=741 bgcolor=#E9E9E9
| 498741 ||  || — || October 1, 2008 || Kitt Peak || Spacewatch || HOF || align=right | 2.3 km || 
|-id=742 bgcolor=#E9E9E9
| 498742 ||  || — || October 2, 2008 || Kitt Peak || Spacewatch ||  || align=right | 1.5 km || 
|-id=743 bgcolor=#E9E9E9
| 498743 ||  || — || October 2, 2008 || Kitt Peak || Spacewatch ||  || align=right | 1.5 km || 
|-id=744 bgcolor=#E9E9E9
| 498744 ||  || — || October 5, 2008 || La Sagra || OAM Obs. ||  || align=right | 2.4 km || 
|-id=745 bgcolor=#d6d6d6
| 498745 ||  || — || October 1, 2008 || Kitt Peak || Spacewatch || KOR  KAR || align=right data-sort-value="0.98" | 980 m || 
|-id=746 bgcolor=#E9E9E9
| 498746 ||  || — || October 6, 2008 || Mount Lemmon || Mount Lemmon Survey ||  || align=right | 1.5 km || 
|-id=747 bgcolor=#E9E9E9
| 498747 ||  || — || October 7, 2008 || Kitt Peak || Spacewatch || WIT || align=right | 2.0 km || 
|-id=748 bgcolor=#E9E9E9
| 498748 ||  || — || October 1, 2008 || Catalina || CSS ||  || align=right | 3.1 km || 
|-id=749 bgcolor=#d6d6d6
| 498749 ||  || — || October 1, 2008 || Kitt Peak || Spacewatch ||  || align=right | 1.8 km || 
|-id=750 bgcolor=#E9E9E9
| 498750 ||  || — || October 22, 2008 || Goodricke-Pigott || R. A. Tucker ||  || align=right | 2.6 km || 
|-id=751 bgcolor=#E9E9E9
| 498751 ||  || — || October 21, 2008 || Mount Lemmon || Mount Lemmon Survey ||  || align=right | 2.3 km || 
|-id=752 bgcolor=#E9E9E9
| 498752 ||  || — || October 22, 2008 || Mount Lemmon || Mount Lemmon Survey || AGN || align=right | 1.00 km || 
|-id=753 bgcolor=#E9E9E9
| 498753 ||  || — || September 2, 2008 || Kitt Peak || Spacewatch ||  || align=right | 1.8 km || 
|-id=754 bgcolor=#E9E9E9
| 498754 ||  || — || September 4, 2008 || Kitt Peak || Spacewatch || AGN || align=right | 1.0 km || 
|-id=755 bgcolor=#E9E9E9
| 498755 ||  || — || September 4, 2008 || Kitt Peak || Spacewatch || HOF || align=right | 1.8 km || 
|-id=756 bgcolor=#E9E9E9
| 498756 ||  || — || September 5, 2008 || Kitt Peak || Spacewatch ||  || align=right | 1.9 km || 
|-id=757 bgcolor=#E9E9E9
| 498757 ||  || — || September 4, 2008 || Kitt Peak || Spacewatch ||  || align=right | 1.7 km || 
|-id=758 bgcolor=#E9E9E9
| 498758 ||  || — || October 17, 2008 || Kitt Peak || Spacewatch ||  || align=right | 1.7 km || 
|-id=759 bgcolor=#E9E9E9
| 498759 ||  || — || October 17, 2008 || Kitt Peak || Spacewatch || AGN || align=right data-sort-value="0.98" | 980 m || 
|-id=760 bgcolor=#E9E9E9
| 498760 ||  || — || October 20, 2008 || Kitt Peak || Spacewatch ||  || align=right | 1.7 km || 
|-id=761 bgcolor=#FA8072
| 498761 ||  || — || October 20, 2008 || Kitt Peak || Spacewatch ||  || align=right data-sort-value="0.48" | 480 m || 
|-id=762 bgcolor=#E9E9E9
| 498762 ||  || — || October 6, 2008 || Mount Lemmon || Mount Lemmon Survey ||  || align=right | 1.8 km || 
|-id=763 bgcolor=#E9E9E9
| 498763 ||  || — || October 20, 2008 || Kitt Peak || Spacewatch ||  || align=right | 1.7 km || 
|-id=764 bgcolor=#E9E9E9
| 498764 ||  || — || October 20, 2008 || Kitt Peak || Spacewatch || HOF || align=right | 2.3 km || 
|-id=765 bgcolor=#fefefe
| 498765 ||  || — || October 20, 2008 || Mount Lemmon || Mount Lemmon Survey || H || align=right data-sort-value="0.56" | 560 m || 
|-id=766 bgcolor=#E9E9E9
| 498766 ||  || — || October 20, 2008 || Kitt Peak || Spacewatch ||  || align=right | 2.0 km || 
|-id=767 bgcolor=#E9E9E9
| 498767 ||  || — || October 21, 2008 || Kitt Peak || Spacewatch || DOR || align=right | 2.4 km || 
|-id=768 bgcolor=#E9E9E9
| 498768 ||  || — || September 24, 2008 || Mount Lemmon || Mount Lemmon Survey || NEM || align=right | 1.9 km || 
|-id=769 bgcolor=#E9E9E9
| 498769 ||  || — || October 8, 2008 || Kitt Peak || Spacewatch ||  || align=right | 1.8 km || 
|-id=770 bgcolor=#E9E9E9
| 498770 ||  || — || October 7, 2008 || Mount Lemmon || Mount Lemmon Survey ||  || align=right | 1.7 km || 
|-id=771 bgcolor=#E9E9E9
| 498771 ||  || — || October 23, 2008 || Kitt Peak || Spacewatch || AGN || align=right data-sort-value="0.99" | 990 m || 
|-id=772 bgcolor=#fefefe
| 498772 ||  || — || September 24, 2008 || Kitt Peak || Spacewatch || NYScritical || align=right data-sort-value="0.50" | 500 m || 
|-id=773 bgcolor=#E9E9E9
| 498773 ||  || — || May 28, 2003 || Kitt Peak || Spacewatch || CLO || align=right | 2.2 km || 
|-id=774 bgcolor=#E9E9E9
| 498774 ||  || — || October 24, 2008 || Catalina || CSS ||  || align=right | 3.1 km || 
|-id=775 bgcolor=#E9E9E9
| 498775 ||  || — || October 21, 2008 || Mount Lemmon || Mount Lemmon Survey ||  || align=right | 2.4 km || 
|-id=776 bgcolor=#d6d6d6
| 498776 ||  || — || October 22, 2008 || Kitt Peak || Spacewatch ||  || align=right | 2.7 km || 
|-id=777 bgcolor=#d6d6d6
| 498777 ||  || — || October 23, 2008 || Kitt Peak || Spacewatch || KOR  KAR || align=right | 1.0 km || 
|-id=778 bgcolor=#d6d6d6
| 498778 ||  || — || October 1, 2008 || Mount Lemmon || Mount Lemmon Survey || KOR || align=right | 1.1 km || 
|-id=779 bgcolor=#E9E9E9
| 498779 ||  || — || October 23, 2008 || Kitt Peak || Spacewatch || MRX || align=right data-sort-value="0.98" | 980 m || 
|-id=780 bgcolor=#E9E9E9
| 498780 ||  || — || October 23, 2008 || Kitt Peak || Spacewatch ||  || align=right | 2.0 km || 
|-id=781 bgcolor=#E9E9E9
| 498781 ||  || — || October 23, 2008 || Kitt Peak || Spacewatch || DOR || align=right | 2.3 km || 
|-id=782 bgcolor=#E9E9E9
| 498782 ||  || — || October 6, 2008 || Kitt Peak || Spacewatch ||  || align=right | 2.8 km || 
|-id=783 bgcolor=#E9E9E9
| 498783 ||  || — || September 24, 2008 || Mount Lemmon || Mount Lemmon Survey || WIT || align=right | 2.5 km || 
|-id=784 bgcolor=#E9E9E9
| 498784 ||  || — || October 7, 2008 || Kitt Peak || Spacewatch || AGN || align=right | 1.0 km || 
|-id=785 bgcolor=#E9E9E9
| 498785 ||  || — || September 27, 2008 || Mount Lemmon || Mount Lemmon Survey ||  || align=right | 2.3 km || 
|-id=786 bgcolor=#E9E9E9
| 498786 ||  || — || October 10, 2008 || Mount Lemmon || Mount Lemmon Survey ||  || align=right | 2.3 km || 
|-id=787 bgcolor=#d6d6d6
| 498787 ||  || — || October 24, 2008 || Kitt Peak || Spacewatch || KOR || align=right | 1.2 km || 
|-id=788 bgcolor=#d6d6d6
| 498788 ||  || — || October 24, 2008 || Kitt Peak || Spacewatch || KOR || align=right | 1.8 km || 
|-id=789 bgcolor=#fefefe
| 498789 ||  || — || October 24, 2008 || Kitt Peak || Spacewatch ||  || align=right data-sort-value="0.51" | 510 m || 
|-id=790 bgcolor=#d6d6d6
| 498790 ||  || — || October 24, 2008 || Kitt Peak || Spacewatch || KOR || align=right | 1.2 km || 
|-id=791 bgcolor=#d6d6d6
| 498791 ||  || — || October 24, 2008 || Mount Lemmon || Mount Lemmon Survey || KOR || align=right | 1.1 km || 
|-id=792 bgcolor=#d6d6d6
| 498792 ||  || — || October 24, 2008 || Mount Lemmon || Mount Lemmon Survey || KOR || align=right | 1.5 km || 
|-id=793 bgcolor=#E9E9E9
| 498793 ||  || — || October 10, 2008 || Catalina || CSS ||  || align=right | 2.2 km || 
|-id=794 bgcolor=#d6d6d6
| 498794 ||  || — || October 6, 2008 || Mount Lemmon || Mount Lemmon Survey || 615 || align=right | 1.5 km || 
|-id=795 bgcolor=#E9E9E9
| 498795 ||  || — || October 23, 2008 || Kitt Peak || Spacewatch ||  || align=right | 1.7 km || 
|-id=796 bgcolor=#E9E9E9
| 498796 ||  || — || October 1, 2008 || Mount Lemmon || Mount Lemmon Survey || WIT || align=right | 1.9 km || 
|-id=797 bgcolor=#E9E9E9
| 498797 Linshiawshin ||  ||  || October 23, 2008 || Lulin || X. Y. Hsiao, Q.-z. Ye ||   HNA || align=right | 2.2 km || 
|-id=798 bgcolor=#d6d6d6
| 498798 ||  || — || October 25, 2008 || Kitt Peak || Spacewatch ||  || align=right | 3.2 km || 
|-id=799 bgcolor=#E9E9E9
| 498799 ||  || — || October 2, 2008 || Mount Lemmon || Mount Lemmon Survey || NEM || align=right | 1.8 km || 
|-id=800 bgcolor=#E9E9E9
| 498800 ||  || — || October 6, 2008 || Mount Lemmon || Mount Lemmon Survey ||  || align=right | 2.0 km || 
|}

498801–498900 

|-bgcolor=#d6d6d6
| 498801 ||  || — || October 6, 2008 || Mount Lemmon || Mount Lemmon Survey ||  || align=right | 1.9 km || 
|-id=802 bgcolor=#E9E9E9
| 498802 ||  || — || September 28, 2008 || Mount Lemmon || Mount Lemmon Survey || HOF || align=right | 1.7 km || 
|-id=803 bgcolor=#d6d6d6
| 498803 ||  || — || October 28, 2008 || Kitt Peak || Spacewatch || KOR || align=right | 1.2 km || 
|-id=804 bgcolor=#d6d6d6
| 498804 ||  || — || October 20, 2008 || Kitt Peak || Spacewatch || KOR || align=right | 1.1 km || 
|-id=805 bgcolor=#E9E9E9
| 498805 ||  || — || September 25, 2008 || Kitt Peak || Spacewatch || MRX || align=right | 1.0 km || 
|-id=806 bgcolor=#E9E9E9
| 498806 ||  || — || October 28, 2008 || Mount Lemmon || Mount Lemmon Survey ||  || align=right | 2.4 km || 
|-id=807 bgcolor=#d6d6d6
| 498807 ||  || — || October 28, 2008 || Mount Lemmon || Mount Lemmon Survey || KOR || align=right | 1.1 km || 
|-id=808 bgcolor=#d6d6d6
| 498808 ||  || — || October 22, 2008 || Kitt Peak || Spacewatch ||  || align=right | 2.2 km || 
|-id=809 bgcolor=#E9E9E9
| 498809 ||  || — || October 8, 2008 || Mount Lemmon || Mount Lemmon Survey ||  || align=right | 1.8 km || 
|-id=810 bgcolor=#E9E9E9
| 498810 ||  || — || October 31, 2008 || Catalina || CSS ||  || align=right | 2.3 km || 
|-id=811 bgcolor=#E9E9E9
| 498811 ||  || — || October 24, 2008 || Catalina || CSS || GEF || align=right | 1.4 km || 
|-id=812 bgcolor=#E9E9E9
| 498812 ||  || — || October 30, 2008 || Mount Lemmon || Mount Lemmon Survey || DOR || align=right | 2.4 km || 
|-id=813 bgcolor=#E9E9E9
| 498813 ||  || — || October 2, 2008 || Kitt Peak || Spacewatch ||  || align=right | 2.0 km || 
|-id=814 bgcolor=#E9E9E9
| 498814 ||  || — || October 30, 2008 || Kitt Peak || Spacewatch ||  || align=right | 2.0 km || 
|-id=815 bgcolor=#d6d6d6
| 498815 ||  || — || October 31, 2008 || Kitt Peak || Spacewatch ||  || align=right | 2.1 km || 
|-id=816 bgcolor=#E9E9E9
| 498816 ||  || — || October 21, 2008 || Kitt Peak || Spacewatch || HOF || align=right | 1.8 km || 
|-id=817 bgcolor=#E9E9E9
| 498817 ||  || — || October 28, 2008 || Kitt Peak || Spacewatch || AGN || align=right data-sort-value="0.94" | 940 m || 
|-id=818 bgcolor=#d6d6d6
| 498818 ||  || — || October 30, 2008 || Mount Lemmon || Mount Lemmon Survey || EOS || align=right | 1.7 km || 
|-id=819 bgcolor=#fefefe
| 498819 ||  || — || October 25, 2008 || Kitt Peak || Spacewatch ||  || align=right data-sort-value="0.66" | 660 m || 
|-id=820 bgcolor=#E9E9E9
| 498820 ||  || — || October 6, 2008 || Catalina || CSS || EUN || align=right | 1.4 km || 
|-id=821 bgcolor=#E9E9E9
| 498821 ||  || — || October 28, 2008 || Catalina || CSS ||   CLO || align=right | 2.5 km || 
|-id=822 bgcolor=#E9E9E9
| 498822 ||  || — || November 1, 2008 || Socorro || LINEAR ||  || align=right | 2.3 km || 
|-id=823 bgcolor=#d6d6d6
| 498823 ||  || — || October 7, 2008 || Kitt Peak || Spacewatch || KOR  KAR || align=right | 1.1 km || 
|-id=824 bgcolor=#d6d6d6
| 498824 ||  || — || June 21, 2007 || Mount Lemmon || Mount Lemmon Survey || KOR || align=right | 1.1 km || 
|-id=825 bgcolor=#E9E9E9
| 498825 ||  || — || November 1, 2008 || Kitt Peak || Spacewatch ||  || align=right | 2.0 km || 
|-id=826 bgcolor=#E9E9E9
| 498826 ||  || — || October 24, 2008 || Kitt Peak || Spacewatch ||  || align=right | 1.9 km || 
|-id=827 bgcolor=#d6d6d6
| 498827 ||  || — || November 2, 2008 || Kitt Peak || Spacewatch || KOR  KAR || align=right | 1.2 km || 
|-id=828 bgcolor=#E9E9E9
| 498828 ||  || — || October 26, 2008 || Kitt Peak || Spacewatch ||  || align=right | 2.8 km || 
|-id=829 bgcolor=#d6d6d6
| 498829 ||  || — || November 8, 2008 || Mount Lemmon || Mount Lemmon Survey || EOS || align=right | 2.8 km || 
|-id=830 bgcolor=#E9E9E9
| 498830 ||  || — || November 18, 2008 || Socorro || LINEAR ||  || align=right | 2.1 km || 
|-id=831 bgcolor=#E9E9E9
| 498831 ||  || — || September 29, 2008 || Kitt Peak || Spacewatch ||  || align=right | 1.9 km || 
|-id=832 bgcolor=#E9E9E9
| 498832 ||  || — || October 8, 2008 || Kitt Peak || Spacewatch ||  || align=right | 2.3 km || 
|-id=833 bgcolor=#E9E9E9
| 498833 ||  || — || September 29, 2008 || Kitt Peak || Spacewatch ||  || align=right | 1.8 km || 
|-id=834 bgcolor=#E9E9E9
| 498834 ||  || — || October 23, 2008 || Kitt Peak || Spacewatch ||  || align=right | 1.8 km || 
|-id=835 bgcolor=#d6d6d6
| 498835 ||  || — || November 19, 2008 || Mount Lemmon || Mount Lemmon Survey ||  || align=right | 1.9 km || 
|-id=836 bgcolor=#d6d6d6
| 498836 ||  || — || October 28, 2008 || Kitt Peak || Spacewatch || KOR || align=right | 1.2 km || 
|-id=837 bgcolor=#d6d6d6
| 498837 ||  || — || October 28, 2008 || Kitt Peak || Spacewatch || KOR || align=right | 1.2 km || 
|-id=838 bgcolor=#d6d6d6
| 498838 ||  || — || December 20, 2004 || Mount Lemmon || Mount Lemmon Survey ||  || align=right | 2.6 km || 
|-id=839 bgcolor=#d6d6d6
| 498839 ||  || — || November 1, 2008 || Kitt Peak || Spacewatch ||  || align=right | 1.9 km || 
|-id=840 bgcolor=#E9E9E9
| 498840 ||  || — || November 18, 2008 || Socorro || LINEAR ||  || align=right | 2.6 km || 
|-id=841 bgcolor=#d6d6d6
| 498841 ||  || — || October 25, 2008 || Mount Lemmon || Mount Lemmon Survey ||  || align=right | 2.3 km || 
|-id=842 bgcolor=#E9E9E9
| 498842 ||  || — || November 20, 2008 || Kitt Peak || Spacewatch ||  || align=right | 2.0 km || 
|-id=843 bgcolor=#d6d6d6
| 498843 ||  || — || November 20, 2008 || Kitt Peak || Spacewatch || KOR || align=right | 1.1 km || 
|-id=844 bgcolor=#d6d6d6
| 498844 ||  || — || November 22, 2008 || La Sagra || OAM Obs. || ALA || align=right | 4.4 km || 
|-id=845 bgcolor=#E9E9E9
| 498845 ||  || — || October 6, 2008 || Mount Lemmon || Mount Lemmon Survey ||  || align=right | 2.4 km || 
|-id=846 bgcolor=#E9E9E9
| 498846 ||  || — || November 8, 2008 || Mount Lemmon || Mount Lemmon Survey || HOF || align=right | 2.2 km || 
|-id=847 bgcolor=#d6d6d6
| 498847 ||  || — || November 22, 2008 || Kitt Peak || Spacewatch ||  || align=right | 3.1 km || 
|-id=848 bgcolor=#d6d6d6
| 498848 ||  || — || November 19, 2008 || Mount Lemmon || Mount Lemmon Survey || TIR || align=right | 4.4 km || 
|-id=849 bgcolor=#E9E9E9
| 498849 ||  || — || November 22, 2008 || Socorro || LINEAR ||  || align=right | 3.5 km || 
|-id=850 bgcolor=#E9E9E9
| 498850 ||  || — || December 3, 2008 || Kitt Peak || Spacewatch ||  || align=right | 2.2 km || 
|-id=851 bgcolor=#d6d6d6
| 498851 ||  || — || December 1, 2008 || Kitt Peak || Spacewatch || KOR || align=right | 1.3 km || 
|-id=852 bgcolor=#E9E9E9
| 498852 ||  || — || December 2, 2008 || Kitt Peak || Spacewatch || AGN || align=right | 1.1 km || 
|-id=853 bgcolor=#d6d6d6
| 498853 ||  || — || November 19, 2008 || Kitt Peak || Spacewatch ||  || align=right | 2.2 km || 
|-id=854 bgcolor=#d6d6d6
| 498854 ||  || — || December 3, 2008 || Mount Lemmon || Mount Lemmon Survey ||  || align=right | 2.3 km || 
|-id=855 bgcolor=#d6d6d6
| 498855 ||  || — || December 4, 2008 || Mount Lemmon || Mount Lemmon Survey ||  || align=right | 2.0 km || 
|-id=856 bgcolor=#E9E9E9
| 498856 ||  || — || December 21, 2008 || Piszkéstető || K. Sárneczky ||  || align=right | 2.4 km || 
|-id=857 bgcolor=#d6d6d6
| 498857 ||  || — || December 21, 2008 || Mount Lemmon || Mount Lemmon Survey || EOS || align=right | 2.6 km || 
|-id=858 bgcolor=#d6d6d6
| 498858 ||  || — || December 22, 2008 || Kitt Peak || Spacewatch || EOS || align=right | 2.7 km || 
|-id=859 bgcolor=#d6d6d6
| 498859 ||  || — || November 19, 2008 || Mount Lemmon || Mount Lemmon Survey ||  || align=right | 2.8 km || 
|-id=860 bgcolor=#E9E9E9
| 498860 ||  || — || December 29, 2008 || Kitt Peak || Spacewatch || AGN || align=right data-sort-value="0.88" | 880 m || 
|-id=861 bgcolor=#d6d6d6
| 498861 ||  || — || December 5, 2008 || Mount Lemmon || Mount Lemmon Survey ||  || align=right | 2.6 km || 
|-id=862 bgcolor=#fefefe
| 498862 ||  || — || December 21, 2008 || Kitt Peak || Spacewatch ||  || align=right data-sort-value="0.58" | 580 m || 
|-id=863 bgcolor=#d6d6d6
| 498863 ||  || — || December 29, 2008 || Mount Lemmon || Mount Lemmon Survey ||  || align=right | 2.6 km || 
|-id=864 bgcolor=#d6d6d6
| 498864 ||  || — || December 29, 2008 || Mount Lemmon || Mount Lemmon Survey || URS || align=right | 2.9 km || 
|-id=865 bgcolor=#d6d6d6
| 498865 ||  || — || December 30, 2008 || Kitt Peak || Spacewatch ||  || align=right | 2.3 km || 
|-id=866 bgcolor=#d6d6d6
| 498866 ||  || — || October 7, 2008 || Mount Lemmon || Mount Lemmon Survey ||  || align=right | 2.4 km || 
|-id=867 bgcolor=#fefefe
| 498867 ||  || — || November 24, 2008 || Mount Lemmon || Mount Lemmon Survey ||  || align=right data-sort-value="0.53" | 530 m || 
|-id=868 bgcolor=#d6d6d6
| 498868 ||  || — || December 31, 2008 || Kitt Peak || Spacewatch || VER || align=right | 2.4 km || 
|-id=869 bgcolor=#d6d6d6
| 498869 ||  || — || November 20, 2008 || Mount Lemmon || Mount Lemmon Survey || BRA || align=right | 1.2 km || 
|-id=870 bgcolor=#d6d6d6
| 498870 ||  || — || December 4, 2008 || Mount Lemmon || Mount Lemmon Survey ||  || align=right | 2.5 km || 
|-id=871 bgcolor=#d6d6d6
| 498871 ||  || — || November 2, 2008 || Mount Lemmon || Mount Lemmon Survey ||  || align=right | 2.8 km || 
|-id=872 bgcolor=#d6d6d6
| 498872 ||  || — || December 29, 2008 || Kitt Peak || Spacewatch ||  || align=right | 2.9 km || 
|-id=873 bgcolor=#d6d6d6
| 498873 ||  || — || December 21, 2008 || Mount Lemmon || Mount Lemmon Survey ||  || align=right | 3.0 km || 
|-id=874 bgcolor=#d6d6d6
| 498874 ||  || — || December 7, 2008 || Mount Lemmon || Mount Lemmon Survey ||  || align=right | 2.4 km || 
|-id=875 bgcolor=#fefefe
| 498875 ||  || — || December 29, 2008 || Kitt Peak || Spacewatch ||  || align=right data-sort-value="0.70" | 700 m || 
|-id=876 bgcolor=#d6d6d6
| 498876 ||  || — || December 21, 2008 || Kitt Peak || Spacewatch ||  || align=right | 2.3 km || 
|-id=877 bgcolor=#d6d6d6
| 498877 ||  || — || December 29, 2008 || Kitt Peak || Spacewatch || EMA || align=right | 3.3 km || 
|-id=878 bgcolor=#d6d6d6
| 498878 ||  || — || December 29, 2008 || Kitt Peak || Spacewatch || EOS || align=right | 1.8 km || 
|-id=879 bgcolor=#d6d6d6
| 498879 ||  || — || December 21, 2008 || Mount Lemmon || Mount Lemmon Survey ||  || align=right | 2.8 km || 
|-id=880 bgcolor=#d6d6d6
| 498880 ||  || — || December 29, 2008 || Kitt Peak || Spacewatch ||  || align=right | 2.4 km || 
|-id=881 bgcolor=#d6d6d6
| 498881 ||  || — || December 2, 2008 || Mount Lemmon || Mount Lemmon Survey ||  || align=right | 3.0 km || 
|-id=882 bgcolor=#d6d6d6
| 498882 ||  || — || November 8, 2008 || Mount Lemmon || Mount Lemmon Survey ||  || align=right | 2.0 km || 
|-id=883 bgcolor=#d6d6d6
| 498883 ||  || — || December 22, 2008 || Kitt Peak || Spacewatch || EOS || align=right | 1.6 km || 
|-id=884 bgcolor=#d6d6d6
| 498884 ||  || — || December 22, 2008 || Kitt Peak || Spacewatch || EOS || align=right | 1.7 km || 
|-id=885 bgcolor=#d6d6d6
| 498885 ||  || — || December 30, 2008 || Kitt Peak || Spacewatch ||  || align=right | 2.4 km || 
|-id=886 bgcolor=#d6d6d6
| 498886 ||  || — || December 4, 2008 || Mount Lemmon || Mount Lemmon Survey ||  || align=right | 2.3 km || 
|-id=887 bgcolor=#d6d6d6
| 498887 ||  || — || December 30, 2008 || Kitt Peak || Spacewatch ||  || align=right | 4.3 km || 
|-id=888 bgcolor=#d6d6d6
| 498888 ||  || — || December 31, 2008 || Kitt Peak || Spacewatch ||  || align=right | 2.6 km || 
|-id=889 bgcolor=#fefefe
| 498889 ||  || — || December 29, 2008 || Mount Lemmon || Mount Lemmon Survey ||  || align=right data-sort-value="0.75" | 750 m || 
|-id=890 bgcolor=#d6d6d6
| 498890 ||  || — || December 30, 2008 || Mount Lemmon || Mount Lemmon Survey ||  || align=right | 2.8 km || 
|-id=891 bgcolor=#d6d6d6
| 498891 ||  || — || December 30, 2008 || Kitt Peak || Spacewatch ||  || align=right | 2.9 km || 
|-id=892 bgcolor=#d6d6d6
| 498892 ||  || — || December 22, 2008 || Mount Lemmon || Mount Lemmon Survey || EOS || align=right | 1.7 km || 
|-id=893 bgcolor=#d6d6d6
| 498893 ||  || — || December 31, 2008 || Kitt Peak || Spacewatch || EOS || align=right | 1.7 km || 
|-id=894 bgcolor=#d6d6d6
| 498894 ||  || — || December 22, 2008 || Kitt Peak || Spacewatch ||  || align=right | 2.1 km || 
|-id=895 bgcolor=#d6d6d6
| 498895 ||  || — || December 22, 2008 || Kitt Peak || Spacewatch || EOS || align=right | 1.6 km || 
|-id=896 bgcolor=#d6d6d6
| 498896 ||  || — || December 22, 2008 || Mount Lemmon || Mount Lemmon Survey || EOS || align=right | 1.7 km || 
|-id=897 bgcolor=#d6d6d6
| 498897 ||  || — || December 30, 2008 || Mount Lemmon || Mount Lemmon Survey ||  || align=right | 2.6 km || 
|-id=898 bgcolor=#d6d6d6
| 498898 ||  || — || December 19, 2008 || Socorro || LINEAR ||  || align=right | 4.7 km || 
|-id=899 bgcolor=#d6d6d6
| 498899 ||  || — || December 30, 2008 || Mount Lemmon || Mount Lemmon Survey ||  || align=right | 2.6 km || 
|-id=900 bgcolor=#d6d6d6
| 498900 ||  || — || December 22, 2008 || Kitt Peak || Spacewatch || TIR || align=right | 2.9 km || 
|}

498901–499000 

|-bgcolor=#d6d6d6
| 498901 ||  || — || August 15, 2007 || Socorro || LINEAR || Tj (2.6) || align=right | 7.1 km || 
|-id=902 bgcolor=#d6d6d6
| 498902 ||  || — || January 1, 2009 || Kitt Peak || Spacewatch ||  || align=right | 2.0 km || 
|-id=903 bgcolor=#d6d6d6
| 498903 ||  || — || December 5, 2008 || Mount Lemmon || Mount Lemmon Survey ||  || align=right | 2.8 km || 
|-id=904 bgcolor=#d6d6d6
| 498904 ||  || — || January 2, 2009 || Mount Lemmon || Mount Lemmon Survey ||  || align=right | 2.9 km || 
|-id=905 bgcolor=#d6d6d6
| 498905 ||  || — || January 2, 2009 || Mount Lemmon || Mount Lemmon Survey ||  || align=right | 2.5 km || 
|-id=906 bgcolor=#d6d6d6
| 498906 ||  || — || December 22, 2008 || Kitt Peak || Spacewatch ||  || align=right | 2.1 km || 
|-id=907 bgcolor=#d6d6d6
| 498907 ||  || — || January 2, 2009 || Mount Lemmon || Mount Lemmon Survey ||  || align=right | 2.5 km || 
|-id=908 bgcolor=#d6d6d6
| 498908 ||  || — || December 30, 2008 || Mount Lemmon || Mount Lemmon Survey || EOS || align=right | 3.1 km || 
|-id=909 bgcolor=#d6d6d6
| 498909 ||  || — || January 2, 2009 || Kitt Peak || Spacewatch ||  || align=right | 2.7 km || 
|-id=910 bgcolor=#d6d6d6
| 498910 ||  || — || January 15, 2009 || Kitt Peak || Spacewatch ||  || align=right | 3.0 km || 
|-id=911 bgcolor=#d6d6d6
| 498911 ||  || — || December 29, 2008 || Mount Lemmon || Mount Lemmon Survey ||  || align=right | 3.0 km || 
|-id=912 bgcolor=#d6d6d6
| 498912 ||  || — || December 6, 2008 || Kitt Peak || Spacewatch ||  || align=right | 2.4 km || 
|-id=913 bgcolor=#fefefe
| 498913 ||  || — || January 15, 2009 || Kitt Peak || Spacewatch ||  || align=right data-sort-value="0.64" | 640 m || 
|-id=914 bgcolor=#d6d6d6
| 498914 ||  || — || January 15, 2009 || Kitt Peak || Spacewatch ||  || align=right | 3.3 km || 
|-id=915 bgcolor=#d6d6d6
| 498915 ||  || — || January 3, 2009 || Mount Lemmon || Mount Lemmon Survey || EOS || align=right | 3.4 km || 
|-id=916 bgcolor=#d6d6d6
| 498916 ||  || — || January 1, 2009 || Mount Lemmon || Mount Lemmon Survey ||  || align=right | 2.1 km || 
|-id=917 bgcolor=#d6d6d6
| 498917 ||  || — || January 7, 2009 || Kitt Peak || Spacewatch || HYG || align=right | 2.0 km || 
|-id=918 bgcolor=#FFC2E0
| 498918 ||  || — || January 16, 2009 || Mount Lemmon || Mount Lemmon Survey || AMO || align=right data-sort-value="0.65" | 650 m || 
|-id=919 bgcolor=#fefefe
| 498919 ||  || — || November 24, 2008 || Mount Lemmon || Mount Lemmon Survey ||  || align=right data-sort-value="0.86" | 860 m || 
|-id=920 bgcolor=#d6d6d6
| 498920 ||  || — || December 1, 2008 || Mount Lemmon || Mount Lemmon Survey ||  || align=right | 4.6 km || 
|-id=921 bgcolor=#d6d6d6
| 498921 ||  || — || December 21, 2008 || Kitt Peak || Spacewatch ||  || align=right | 2.8 km || 
|-id=922 bgcolor=#d6d6d6
| 498922 ||  || — || January 16, 2009 || Kitt Peak || Spacewatch ||  || align=right | 3.0 km || 
|-id=923 bgcolor=#d6d6d6
| 498923 ||  || — || December 22, 2008 || Kitt Peak || Spacewatch ||  || align=right | 2.5 km || 
|-id=924 bgcolor=#d6d6d6
| 498924 ||  || — || January 1, 2009 || Mount Lemmon || Mount Lemmon Survey || TIR || align=right | 3.1 km || 
|-id=925 bgcolor=#d6d6d6
| 498925 ||  || — || December 22, 2008 || Kitt Peak || Spacewatch || EOS || align=right | 1.4 km || 
|-id=926 bgcolor=#d6d6d6
| 498926 ||  || — || December 22, 2008 || Kitt Peak || Spacewatch || HYG || align=right | 2.8 km || 
|-id=927 bgcolor=#fefefe
| 498927 ||  || — || January 16, 2009 || Kitt Peak || Spacewatch ||  || align=right data-sort-value="0.63" | 630 m || 
|-id=928 bgcolor=#d6d6d6
| 498928 ||  || — || October 8, 2007 || Catalina || CSS ||  || align=right | 2.3 km || 
|-id=929 bgcolor=#fefefe
| 498929 ||  || — || January 2, 2009 || Mount Lemmon || Mount Lemmon Survey ||  || align=right data-sort-value="0.67" | 670 m || 
|-id=930 bgcolor=#d6d6d6
| 498930 ||  || — || January 1, 2009 || Mount Lemmon || Mount Lemmon Survey ||  || align=right | 2.2 km || 
|-id=931 bgcolor=#fefefe
| 498931 ||  || — || January 16, 2009 || Kitt Peak || Spacewatch ||  || align=right data-sort-value="0.60" | 600 m || 
|-id=932 bgcolor=#d6d6d6
| 498932 ||  || — || January 1, 2009 || Mount Lemmon || Mount Lemmon Survey ||  || align=right | 3.4 km || 
|-id=933 bgcolor=#fefefe
| 498933 ||  || — || January 16, 2009 || Kitt Peak || Spacewatch ||  || align=right data-sort-value="0.58" | 580 m || 
|-id=934 bgcolor=#d6d6d6
| 498934 ||  || — || January 16, 2009 || Kitt Peak || Spacewatch ||  || align=right | 2.1 km || 
|-id=935 bgcolor=#d6d6d6
| 498935 ||  || — || January 16, 2009 || Kitt Peak || Spacewatch || VER || align=right | 2.2 km || 
|-id=936 bgcolor=#fefefe
| 498936 ||  || — || December 30, 2008 || Mount Lemmon || Mount Lemmon Survey ||  || align=right data-sort-value="0.85" | 850 m || 
|-id=937 bgcolor=#d6d6d6
| 498937 ||  || — || January 16, 2009 || Kitt Peak || Spacewatch ||  || align=right | 2.2 km || 
|-id=938 bgcolor=#d6d6d6
| 498938 ||  || — || December 7, 2008 || Mount Lemmon || Mount Lemmon Survey ||  || align=right | 3.6 km || 
|-id=939 bgcolor=#d6d6d6
| 498939 ||  || — || January 2, 2009 || Mount Lemmon || Mount Lemmon Survey ||  || align=right | 2.6 km || 
|-id=940 bgcolor=#d6d6d6
| 498940 ||  || — || December 21, 2008 || Kitt Peak || Spacewatch ||  || align=right | 3.7 km || 
|-id=941 bgcolor=#fefefe
| 498941 ||  || — || December 22, 2008 || Mount Lemmon || Mount Lemmon Survey ||  || align=right data-sort-value="0.60" | 600 m || 
|-id=942 bgcolor=#d6d6d6
| 498942 ||  || — || December 22, 2008 || Kitt Peak || Spacewatch ||  || align=right | 2.3 km || 
|-id=943 bgcolor=#d6d6d6
| 498943 ||  || — || January 16, 2009 || Kitt Peak || Spacewatch || URS || align=right | 2.8 km || 
|-id=944 bgcolor=#d6d6d6
| 498944 ||  || — || January 1, 2009 || Mount Lemmon || Mount Lemmon Survey ||  || align=right | 2.7 km || 
|-id=945 bgcolor=#d6d6d6
| 498945 ||  || — || November 2, 2008 || Mount Lemmon || Mount Lemmon Survey ||  || align=right | 2.7 km || 
|-id=946 bgcolor=#d6d6d6
| 498946 ||  || — || January 18, 2009 || Kitt Peak || Spacewatch || HYG || align=right | 2.0 km || 
|-id=947 bgcolor=#fefefe
| 498947 ||  || — || January 18, 2009 || Mount Lemmon || Mount Lemmon Survey || NYS || align=right data-sort-value="0.50" | 500 m || 
|-id=948 bgcolor=#d6d6d6
| 498948 ||  || — || January 18, 2009 || Kitt Peak || Spacewatch ||  || align=right | 3.5 km || 
|-id=949 bgcolor=#d6d6d6
| 498949 ||  || — || January 25, 2009 || Catalina || CSS ||  || align=right | 3.0 km || 
|-id=950 bgcolor=#d6d6d6
| 498950 ||  || — || January 22, 2009 || Dauban || F. Kugel ||  || align=right | 4.4 km || 
|-id=951 bgcolor=#d6d6d6
| 498951 ||  || — || December 21, 2008 || Kitt Peak || Spacewatch || EOS || align=right | 1.7 km || 
|-id=952 bgcolor=#d6d6d6
| 498952 ||  || — || January 2, 2009 || Mount Lemmon || Mount Lemmon Survey || THM || align=right | 1.9 km || 
|-id=953 bgcolor=#d6d6d6
| 498953 ||  || — || January 25, 2009 || Kitt Peak || Spacewatch ||  || align=right | 2.3 km || 
|-id=954 bgcolor=#fefefe
| 498954 ||  || — || January 25, 2009 || Kitt Peak || Spacewatch ||  || align=right data-sort-value="0.50" | 500 m || 
|-id=955 bgcolor=#d6d6d6
| 498955 ||  || — || January 15, 2009 || Kitt Peak || Spacewatch ||  || align=right | 2.0 km || 
|-id=956 bgcolor=#d6d6d6
| 498956 ||  || — || January 15, 2009 || Kitt Peak || Spacewatch ||  || align=right | 2.9 km || 
|-id=957 bgcolor=#d6d6d6
| 498957 ||  || — || December 30, 2008 || Mount Lemmon || Mount Lemmon Survey || EOS || align=right | 1.7 km || 
|-id=958 bgcolor=#d6d6d6
| 498958 ||  || — || January 25, 2009 || Kitt Peak || Spacewatch || EOS || align=right | 1.8 km || 
|-id=959 bgcolor=#d6d6d6
| 498959 ||  || — || January 1, 2009 || Mount Lemmon || Mount Lemmon Survey ||  || align=right | 2.9 km || 
|-id=960 bgcolor=#d6d6d6
| 498960 ||  || — || January 25, 2009 || Kitt Peak || Spacewatch ||  || align=right | 2.7 km || 
|-id=961 bgcolor=#fefefe
| 498961 ||  || — || January 15, 2009 || Kitt Peak || Spacewatch ||  || align=right data-sort-value="0.57" | 570 m || 
|-id=962 bgcolor=#d6d6d6
| 498962 ||  || — || January 20, 2009 || Kitt Peak || Spacewatch || EOS || align=right | 4.0 km || 
|-id=963 bgcolor=#d6d6d6
| 498963 ||  || — || January 29, 2009 || Kitt Peak || Spacewatch ||  || align=right | 2.7 km || 
|-id=964 bgcolor=#fefefe
| 498964 ||  || — || January 20, 2009 || Kitt Peak || Spacewatch ||  || align=right data-sort-value="0.60" | 600 m || 
|-id=965 bgcolor=#d6d6d6
| 498965 ||  || — || November 24, 2008 || Mount Lemmon || Mount Lemmon Survey || EOS || align=right | 1.6 km || 
|-id=966 bgcolor=#d6d6d6
| 498966 ||  || — || October 9, 2007 || Mount Lemmon || Mount Lemmon Survey ||  || align=right | 2.2 km || 
|-id=967 bgcolor=#d6d6d6
| 498967 ||  || — || January 20, 2009 || Kitt Peak || Spacewatch ||  || align=right | 2.9 km || 
|-id=968 bgcolor=#d6d6d6
| 498968 ||  || — || January 29, 2009 || Kitt Peak || Spacewatch || EOS || align=right | 1.4 km || 
|-id=969 bgcolor=#d6d6d6
| 498969 ||  || — || January 30, 2009 || Mount Lemmon || Mount Lemmon Survey ||  || align=right | 2.8 km || 
|-id=970 bgcolor=#d6d6d6
| 498970 ||  || — || December 22, 2008 || Kitt Peak || Spacewatch || EOS || align=right | 1.9 km || 
|-id=971 bgcolor=#d6d6d6
| 498971 ||  || — || January 2, 2009 || Mount Lemmon || Mount Lemmon Survey ||  || align=right | 2.3 km || 
|-id=972 bgcolor=#d6d6d6
| 498972 ||  || — || January 29, 2009 || Kitt Peak || Spacewatch ||  || align=right | 1.9 km || 
|-id=973 bgcolor=#d6d6d6
| 498973 ||  || — || January 29, 2009 || Kitt Peak || Spacewatch ||  || align=right | 2.0 km || 
|-id=974 bgcolor=#d6d6d6
| 498974 ||  || — || August 19, 2006 || Kitt Peak || Spacewatch || EOS || align=right | 2.9 km || 
|-id=975 bgcolor=#d6d6d6
| 498975 ||  || — || January 3, 2009 || Mount Lemmon || Mount Lemmon Survey || TEL  EOS || align=right data-sort-value="0.93" | 930 m || 
|-id=976 bgcolor=#d6d6d6
| 498976 ||  || — || January 16, 2009 || Kitt Peak || Spacewatch || URS || align=right | 3.1 km || 
|-id=977 bgcolor=#d6d6d6
| 498977 ||  || — || January 30, 2009 || Kitt Peak || Spacewatch ||  || align=right | 1.8 km || 
|-id=978 bgcolor=#d6d6d6
| 498978 ||  || — || January 16, 2009 || Kitt Peak || Spacewatch || EOS || align=right | 1.4 km || 
|-id=979 bgcolor=#d6d6d6
| 498979 ||  || — || January 30, 2009 || Mount Lemmon || Mount Lemmon Survey ||  || align=right | 2.4 km || 
|-id=980 bgcolor=#d6d6d6
| 498980 ||  || — || January 20, 2009 || Kitt Peak || Spacewatch ||  || align=right | 2.9 km || 
|-id=981 bgcolor=#d6d6d6
| 498981 ||  || — || January 2, 2009 || Mount Lemmon || Mount Lemmon Survey || EOS || align=right | 1.5 km || 
|-id=982 bgcolor=#d6d6d6
| 498982 ||  || — || December 29, 2008 || Mount Lemmon || Mount Lemmon Survey || EOS || align=right | 1.5 km || 
|-id=983 bgcolor=#fefefe
| 498983 ||  || — || January 31, 2009 || Kitt Peak || Spacewatch ||  || align=right data-sort-value="0.60" | 600 m || 
|-id=984 bgcolor=#d6d6d6
| 498984 ||  || — || January 31, 2009 || Kitt Peak || Spacewatch || THM || align=right | 2.0 km || 
|-id=985 bgcolor=#d6d6d6
| 498985 ||  || — || January 31, 2009 || Kitt Peak || Spacewatch || KOR || align=right | 1.3 km || 
|-id=986 bgcolor=#fefefe
| 498986 ||  || — || January 25, 2009 || Kitt Peak || Spacewatch || CHL || align=right data-sort-value="0.61" | 610 m || 
|-id=987 bgcolor=#fefefe
| 498987 ||  || — || January 20, 2009 || Kitt Peak || Spacewatch ||  || align=right data-sort-value="0.70" | 700 m || 
|-id=988 bgcolor=#fefefe
| 498988 ||  || — || January 16, 2009 || Kitt Peak || Spacewatch || H || align=right data-sort-value="0.49" | 490 m || 
|-id=989 bgcolor=#d6d6d6
| 498989 ||  || — || January 17, 2009 || Mount Lemmon || Mount Lemmon Survey || EOS || align=right | 1.5 km || 
|-id=990 bgcolor=#d6d6d6
| 498990 ||  || — || January 18, 2009 || Kitt Peak || Spacewatch ||  || align=right | 3.1 km || 
|-id=991 bgcolor=#fefefe
| 498991 ||  || — || January 25, 2009 || Catalina || CSS || H || align=right data-sort-value="0.58" | 580 m || 
|-id=992 bgcolor=#d6d6d6
| 498992 ||  || — || January 25, 2009 || Kitt Peak || Spacewatch || HYG || align=right | 2.4 km || 
|-id=993 bgcolor=#d6d6d6
| 498993 ||  || — || January 31, 2009 || Mount Lemmon || Mount Lemmon Survey || Tj (2.95) || align=right | 4.6 km || 
|-id=994 bgcolor=#fefefe
| 498994 ||  || — || January 16, 2009 || Kitt Peak || Spacewatch ||  || align=right data-sort-value="0.54" | 540 m || 
|-id=995 bgcolor=#d6d6d6
| 498995 ||  || — || January 28, 2009 || Catalina || CSS ||  || align=right | 3.1 km || 
|-id=996 bgcolor=#d6d6d6
| 498996 ||  || — || January 29, 2009 || Mount Lemmon || Mount Lemmon Survey ||  || align=right | 2.6 km || 
|-id=997 bgcolor=#d6d6d6
| 498997 ||  || — || January 30, 2009 || Kitt Peak || Spacewatch || HYG || align=right | 2.3 km || 
|-id=998 bgcolor=#d6d6d6
| 498998 ||  || — || January 18, 2009 || Catalina || CSS ||  || align=right | 3.0 km || 
|-id=999 bgcolor=#d6d6d6
| 498999 ||  || — || December 21, 2008 || Kitt Peak || Spacewatch ||  || align=right | 2.4 km || 
|-id=000 bgcolor=#d6d6d6
| 499000 ||  || — || December 30, 2008 || Mount Lemmon || Mount Lemmon Survey ||  || align=right | 2.8 km || 
|}

References

External links 
 Discovery Circumstances: Numbered Minor Planets (495001)–(500000) (IAU Minor Planet Center)

0498